= The Disasters of War =

Series of prints by Francisco Goya

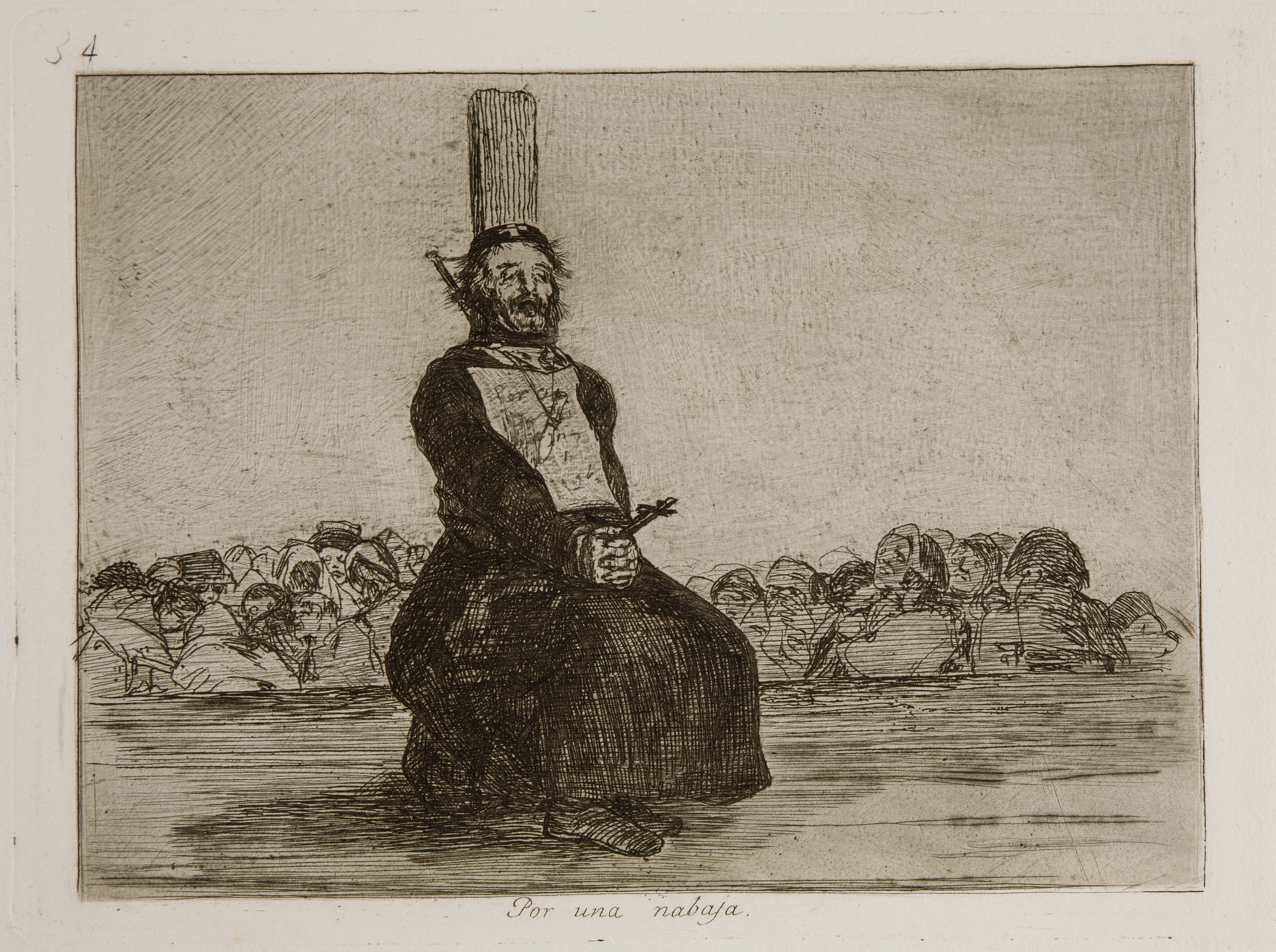
Plate 34: Por una navaja (For a clasp knife). A garroted priest grasps a crucifix in his hands. Pinned to his chest is a description of the crime for which he was killed—possession of a knife.

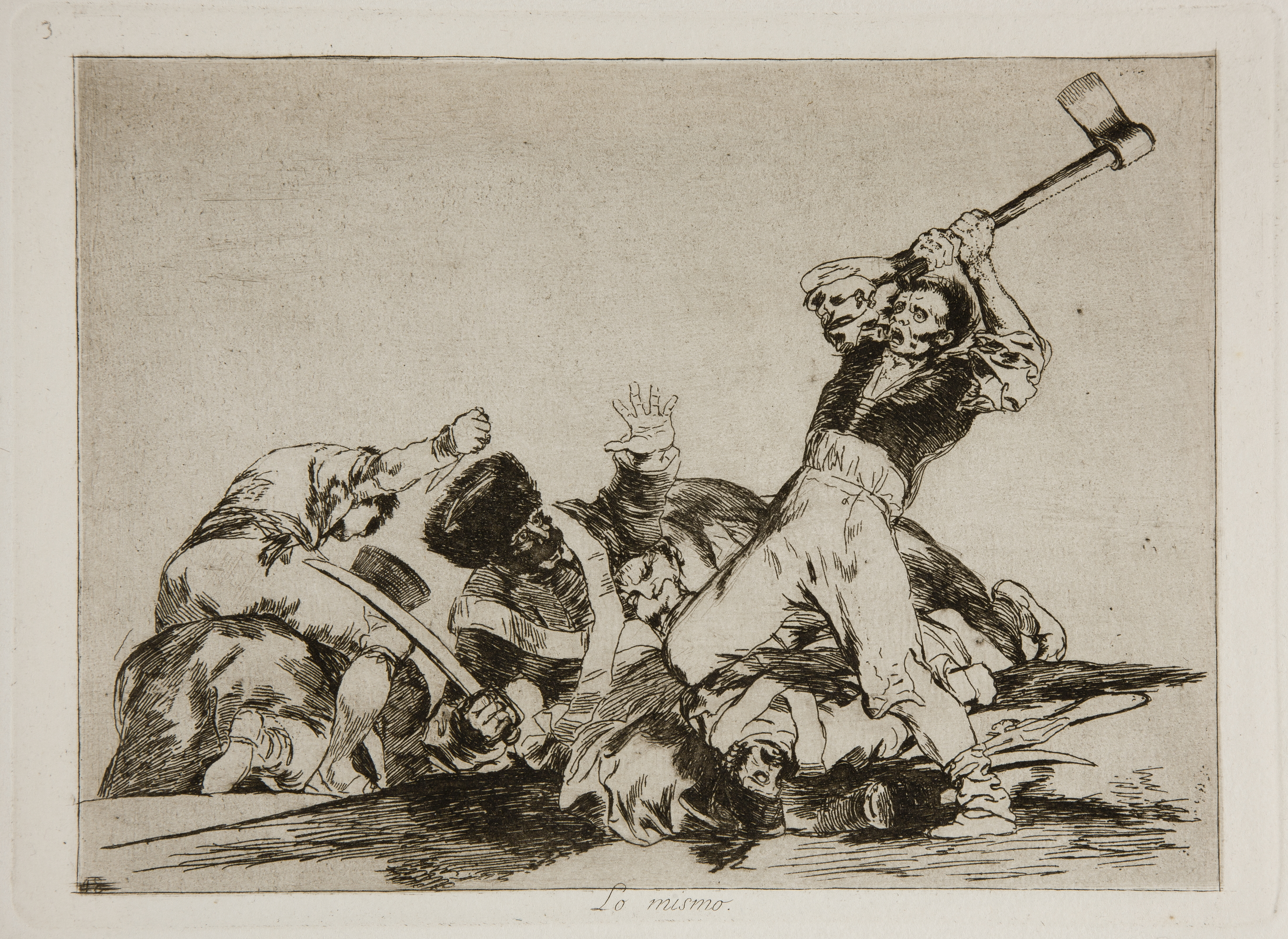
Plate 3: Lo mismo (The same). A Spanish civilian about to decapitate a French soldier with an axe.

The Disasters of War (Spanish: Los desastres de la guerra) is a series of 82 (Note: 80 prints in the first published edition (1863), for which the last two plates were not available. See "Execution".) prints created between 1810 and 1820 by the Spanish painter and printmaker Francisco Goya. Although Goya did not make known his intention when creating the plates, art historians view them as a visual protest against the violence of the 1808 Dos de Mayo Uprising, the subsequent cruel war that ended in Spanish victory in the Peninsular War of 1808–1814 and the setbacks to the liberal cause following the restoration of the Bourbon monarchy in 1814. During the conflicts between Napoleon's French Empire and Spain, Goya retained his position as first court painter to the Spanish crown and continued to produce portraits of the Spanish and French rulers. Although deeply affected by the war, he kept private his thoughts on the art he produced in response to the conflict and its aftermath.

He was in poor health and almost deaf when, at 62, he began work on the prints. They were not published until 1863, 35 years after his death. It is likely that only then was it considered politically safe to distribute a sequence of artworks criticising both the French and restored Bourbons. In total over a thousand sets have been printed, though later ones are of lower quality, and most print room collections have at least some of the set.

The name by which the series is known today is not Goya's own. His handwritten title on an album of proofs given to a friend reads: Fatal Consequences of Spain's Bloody War with Bonaparte, and Other Emphatic Caprices (Fatales consequencias de la sangrienta guerra en España con Buonaparte, Y otros caprichos enfáticos). Aside from the titles or captions given to each print, these are Goya's only known words on the series. With these works, he breaks from a number of painterly traditions. He rejects the bombastic heroics of most previous Spanish war art to show the effect of conflict on individuals. In addition he abandons colour in favour of a more direct truth he found in shadow and shade.

The series was produced using a variety of intaglio printmaking techniques, mainly etching for the line work and aquatint for the tonal areas, but also engraving and drypoint. As with many other Goya prints, they are sometimes referred to as aquatints, but more often as etchings. The series is usually considered in three groups which broadly mirror the order of their creation. The first 47 focus on incidents from the war and show the consequences of the conflict on individual soldiers and civilians. The middle series (plates 48 to 64) record the effects of the famine that hit Madrid in 1811–12, before the city was liberated from the French. The final 17 reflect the bitter disappointment of liberals when the restored Bourbon monarchy, encouraged by the Catholic hierarchy, rejected the Spanish Constitution of 1812 and opposed both state and religious reform. Goya's scenes of atrocities, starvation, degradation and humiliation have been described as the "prodigious flowering of rage". The serial nature in which the plates unfold has led some to see the images as similar in nature to photography.

== Historical background ==
Napoleon Bonaparte declared himself First Consul of the French Republic on 18 February 1799, and was crowned Emperor in 1804. Because Spain controlled access to the Mediterranean, it was politically and strategically important to him. The reigning Spanish sovereign, Charles IV, was internationally regarded as ineffectual, and his position at the time was threatened by his pro-British heir, Crown Prince Ferdinand. Napoleon took advantage of Charles's weak standing by suggesting the two nations conquer Portugal—the spoils to be divided equally between France, Spain and the Spanish Prime Minister, Manuel de Godoy, who would take the title "Prince of the Algarve". Seduced by the French offer, Godoy accepted, failing to detect the true motivations of either Napoleon or Ferdinand, who both intended to use the invasion as a ploy, to seize power in Spain.

In The Third of May 1808, along with its companion work The Second of May 1808, Goya sought to commemorate Spanish resistance to Napoleon's armies during the occupation of 1808. Both were produced in 1814, while the print series was in progress.

Under the guise of reinforcing the Spanish armies, 25,000 French troops entered Spain unopposed in November 1807. Even when their intentions became clear the following February, the occupying forces faced little resistance besides isolated actions in disconnected areas. In 1808, a popular uprising—incited by Ferdinand's supporters—saw Godoy captured and left Charles with no choice but to abdicate; he did so on 19 March 1808, allowing his son to ascend the throne as Ferdinand VII. Ferdinand had been seeking French patronage, but Napoleon and his principal commander, Marshal Joachim Murat, believed that Spain would benefit from rulers who were more progressive and competent than the Bourbons. They decided that Napoleon's brother, Joseph Bonaparte, should be king. Under a pretext of mediation, Napoleon summoned Charles and Ferdinand to Bayonne, France, where they were coerced into relinquishing their rights to the throne in favour of Joseph.

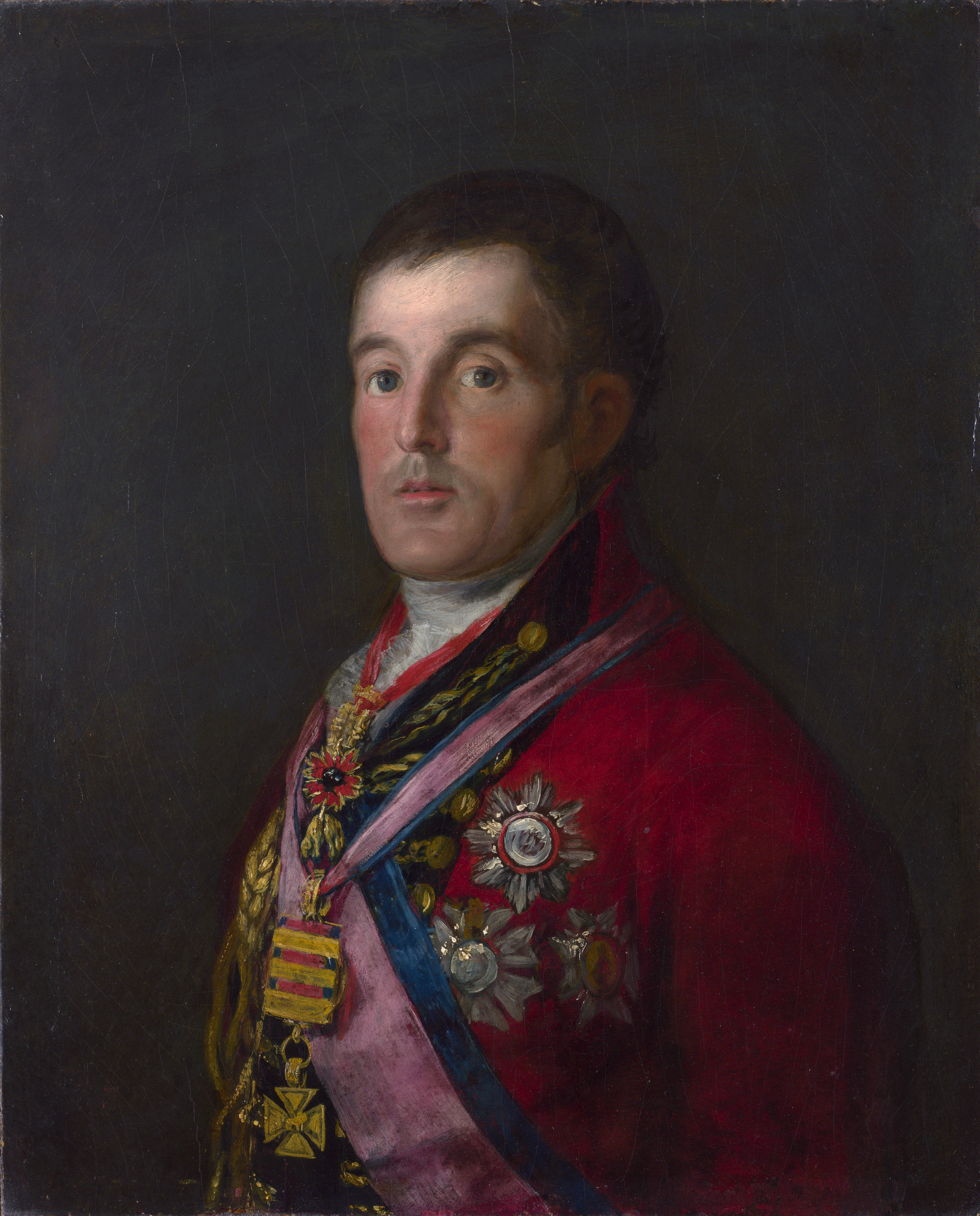
Francisco Goya, Portrait of the Duke of Wellington, 1812–1814. During the Peninsular War, the British, led by Wellington, led a proxy war against Napoleon's marshals and the Imperial French Army.

Like other Spanish liberals, Goya was left in a difficult position after the French invasion. He had supported the initial aims of the French Revolution, and hoped its ideals would help liberate Spain from feudalism to become a secular, democratic political system. There were two conflicts being fought in Spain: the resistance against the French threat, and a domestic struggle between the ideals of liberal modernisation and the pre-political incumbent ruling class. The latter divide became more pronounced—and the differences far more entrenched—following the eventual withdrawal of the French.

Several of Goya's friends, including the poets Juan Meléndez Valdés and Leandro Fernández de Moratín, were overt afrancesados: the supporters (or collaborators, in the view of many) of Joseph Bonaparte. He maintained his position as court painter, for which an oath of loyalty to Joseph was necessary. However, Goya had an instinctive dislike of authority, and witnessed first-hand the subjugation of his countrymen by French troops. (Note: That Goya had first-hand knowledge of events depicted in The Disasters of War is implied by the title of the print I saw it.) During these years he painted little aside from portraits of figures from all parties, including an allegorical painting of Joseph Bonaparte in 1810, Wellington from 1812 to 1814, and French and Spanish generals. (Note: Both the Bonaparte allegory and Wellington's medals and orders required updating soon after to reflect the changing situation—Wilson-Bareau, 45, and, for Wellington, Neil MacLaren, revised Allan Braham, The Spanish School, National Gallery Catalogues. National Gallery London, 1970. 16–20. ISBN 0-947645-46-2) Meanwhile, Goya was working on drawings that would form the basis for The Disasters of War. He visited many battle sites around Madrid to witness the Spanish resistance. The final plates are testament to what he described as "el desmembramiento d'España"—the dismemberment of Spain.

== Plates ==
Art historians broadly agree that The Disasters of War is divided into three thematic groupings—war, famine, and political and cultural allegories. This sequence broadly reflects the order in which the plates were created. Few of the plates or drawings are dated; instead, their chronology has been established by identifying specific incidents to which the plates refer, and the different batches of plates used, which allow sequential groups to be divined. For the most part, Goya's numbering agrees with these other methods. However, there are several exceptions. For example, plate 1 was among the last to be completed, after the end of the war.

In the early plates of the war grouping, Goya's sympathies appear to lie with the Spanish defenders. These images typically show patriots facing hulking, anonymous invaders who treat them with fierce cruelty. As the series progresses, the distinction between the Spanish and the imperialists becomes ambiguous. In other plates, it is difficult to tell to which camp the distorted and disfigured corpses belong. Some of the titles deliberately question the intentions of both sides; for example, Con razon ó sin ella can mean with or without reason, rightly or wrongly, or for something or for nothing. Critic Philip Shaw notes that the ambiguity is still present in the final group of plates, saying there is no distinction between the "heroic defenders of the Fatherland and the barbaric supporters of the old regime".

=== War ===
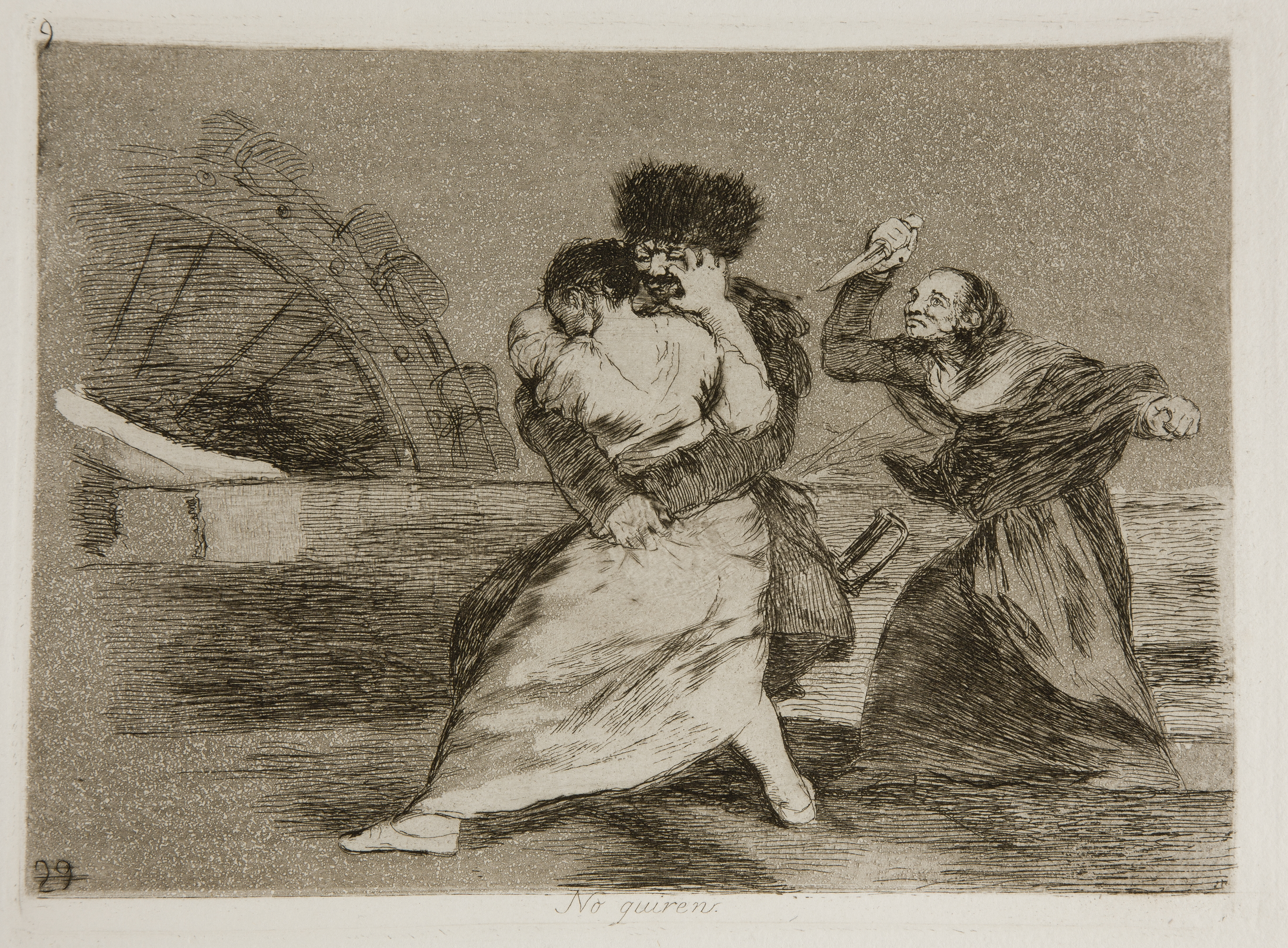
Plate 9: No quieren (They do not want to). An elderly Spanish woman wields a knife in defence of a young Spanish woman who is being sexually assaulted by a French soldier.

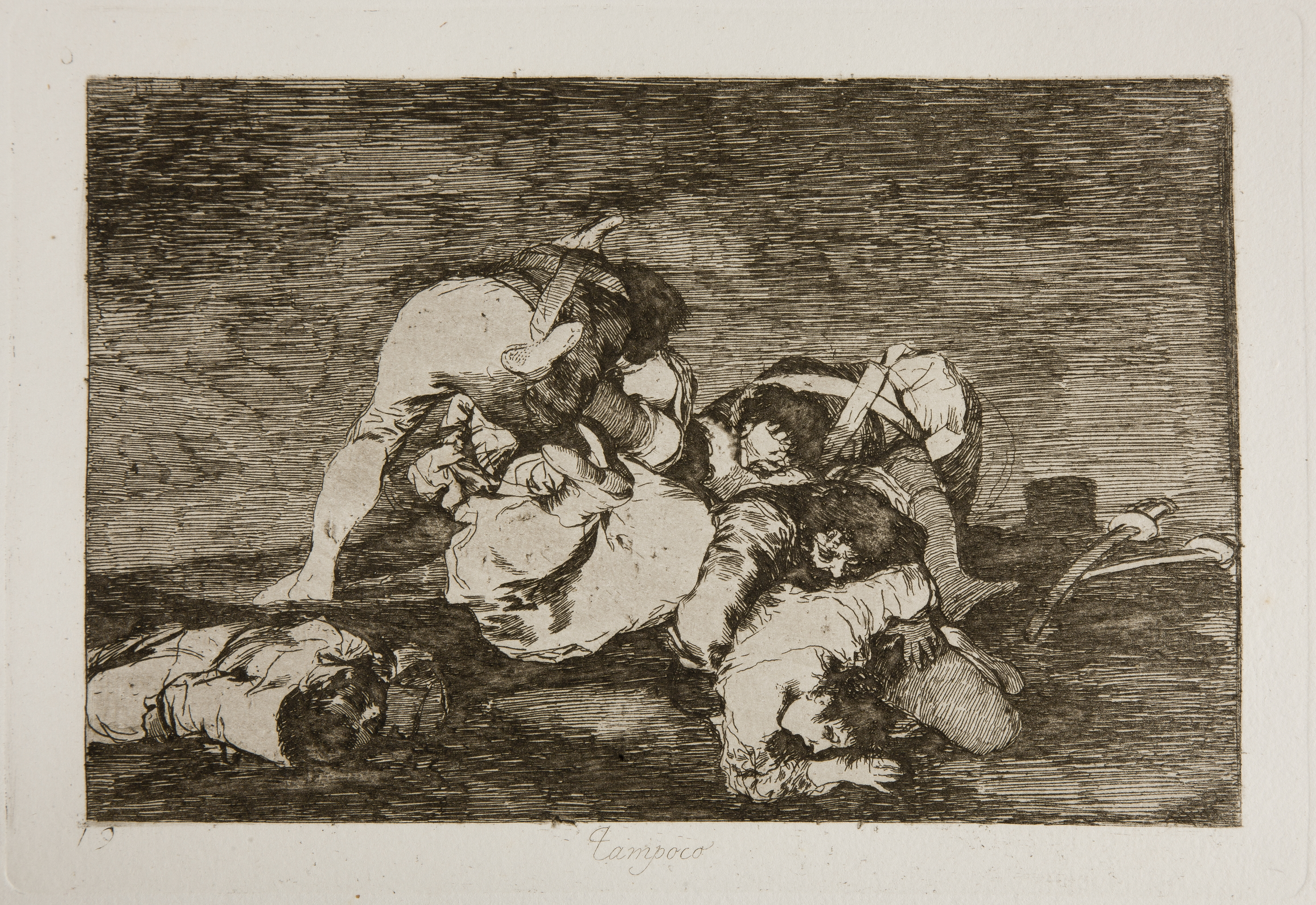
Plate 10: Tampoco (Nor do these). Two Spanish struggling women being sexually assaulted by Napoleonic French soldiers.

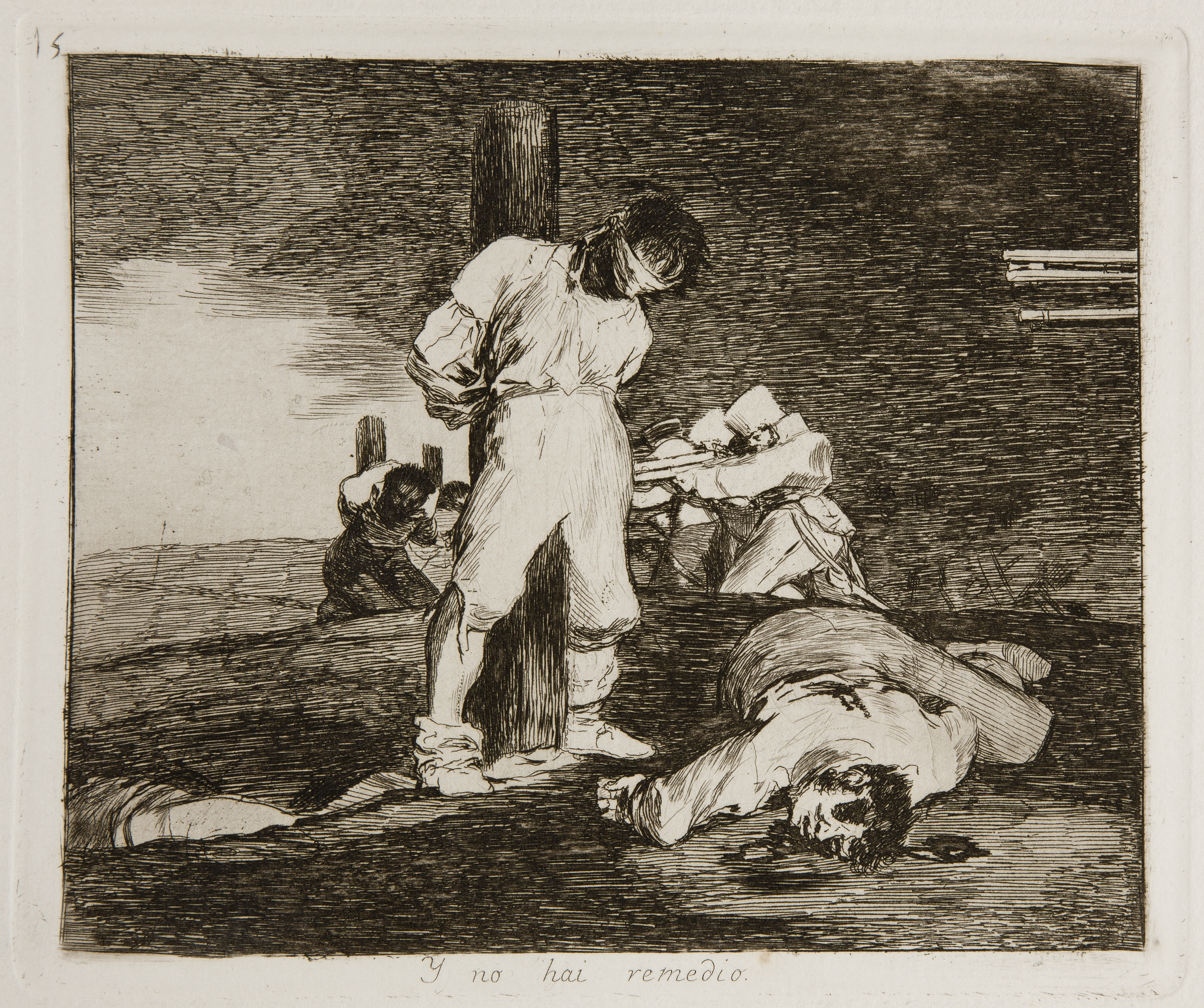
Plate 15: Y no hay remedio (And it cannot be helped). Prisoners executed by firing squads, reminiscent of The Third of May 1808.

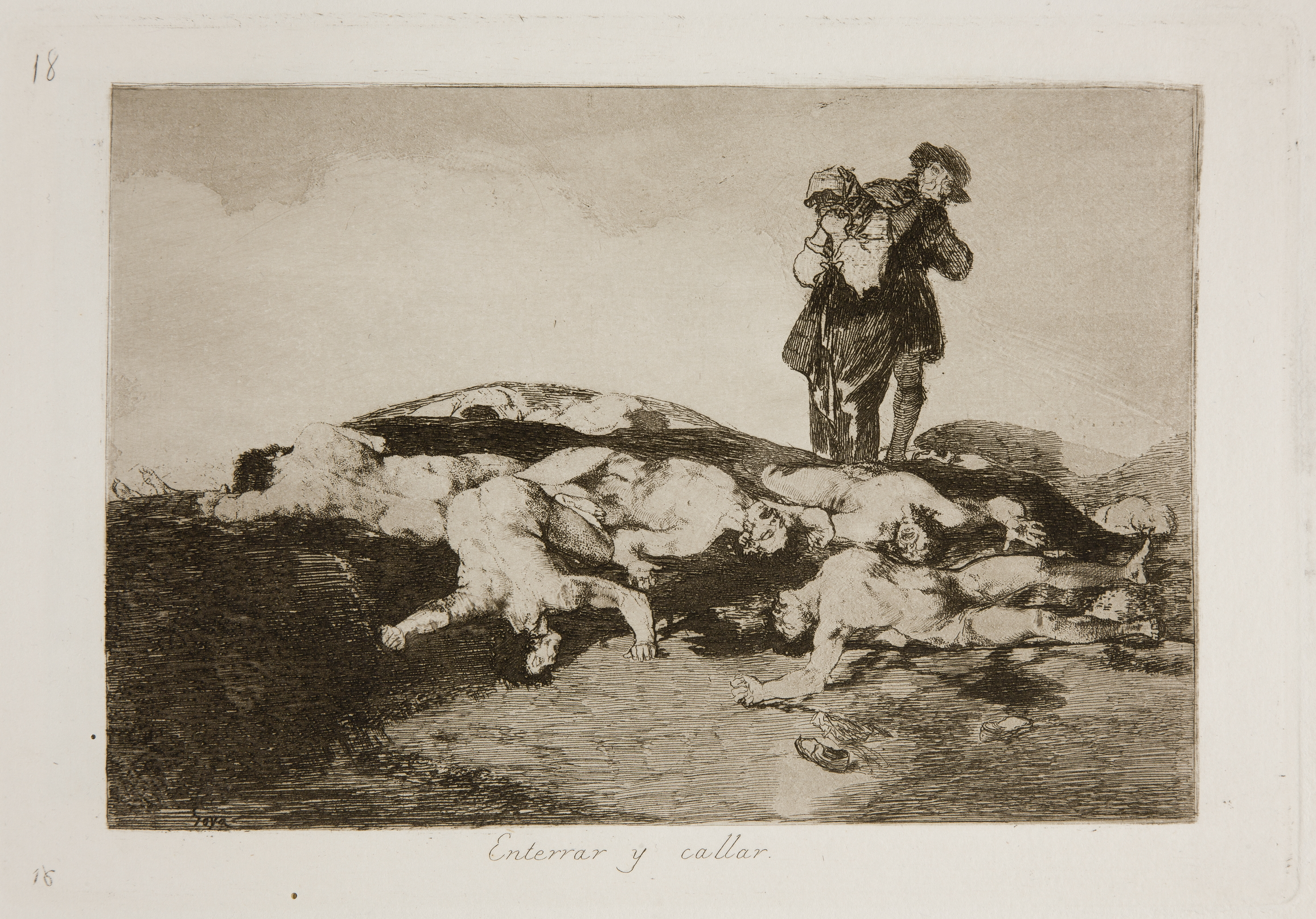
Plate 18: Enterrar y callar (Bury them and keep quiet). Atrocities, starvation and human degradation are described as the "prodigious flowering of rage".

Plates 1 to 47 consist mainly of realistic depictions of the horrors of the war fought against the French. Most portray the aftermath of battle; they include mutilated torsos and limbs mounted on trees, like "fragments of marble sculpture". Both French and Spanish troops tortured and mutilated captives; evidence of such acts is minutely detailed across a number of Goya's plates. Civilian death is also captured in detail. Spanish women were commonly victims of assault and rape. Civilians often followed armies to battle scenes. If their side won, women and children would search the battlefield for their husbands, fathers and sons. If they lost, they fled in fear of being raped or murdered. In plate 9, No quieren (They do not want to), an elderly woman is shown wielding a knife in defence of a young woman who is being assaulted by a soldier.

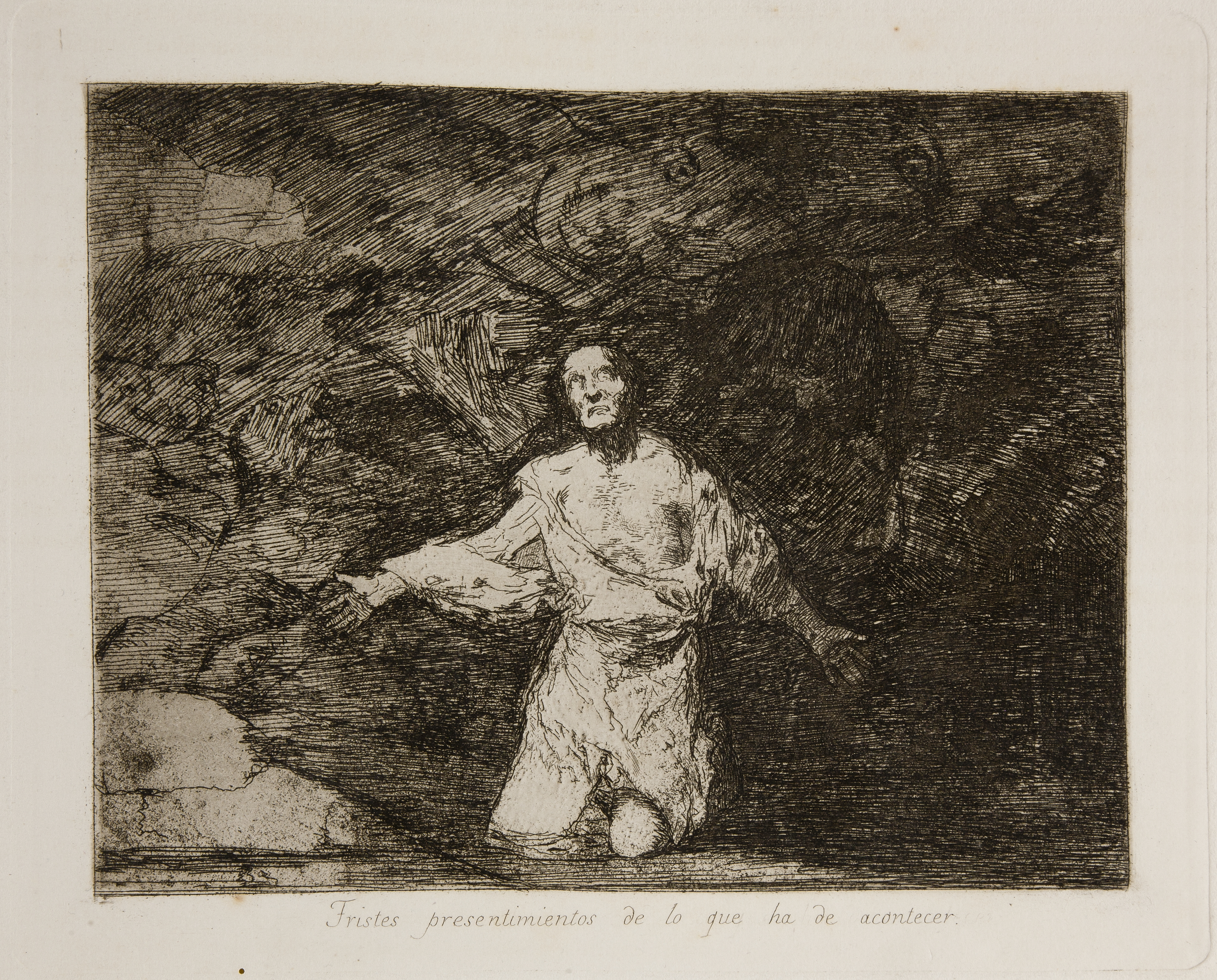
Plate 1: Tristes presentimientos de lo que ha de acontecer (Sad forebodings of what must come to pass). This plate was from one of the last groups to be created.

The group begins with Tristes presentimientos de lo que ha de acontecer (Sad forebodings of what must come to pass), in which a man kneels in the darkness with outstretched arms. The following plates describe combat with the French, who—according to art critic Vivien Raynor—are depicted "rather like Cossacks, bayoneting civilians", while Spanish civilians are shown "poleaxing the French." Plates 31 to 39 focus on atrocities and were produced on the same batch of plates as the famine group. Others are based on drawings Goya had completed in his Sketchbook-journal, in studies where he examined the theme of the grotesque body in relation to the iconography of the tortured or martyred one. In his India ink wash drawing We cannot look at this (1814–24), he examined the idea of a humiliated inverted body with pathos and tragedy, as he did to comical effect in The Straw Mannequin (1791–92).

Unlike most earlier Spanish art, Goya's rejects the ideals of heroic dignity. He refuses to focus on individual participants; though he drew from many classic art sources, his works pointedly portray the protagonists as anonymous casualties, rather than known patriots. The exception is plate 7, Que valor! (What courage!), which depicts Agustina de Aragón (1786–1857), heroine of the first siege of Zaragoza, who, after seeing the killing of the cannoneers defending the city to whom she had been bringing food, loaded and fired a cannon herself into the French forces. Although it is agreed that Goya could not have witnessed this incident, Robert Hughes believes it may have been his visit to Zaragoza in the lull between the first and second phases of the siege that inspired him to produce the series.

=== Famine ===
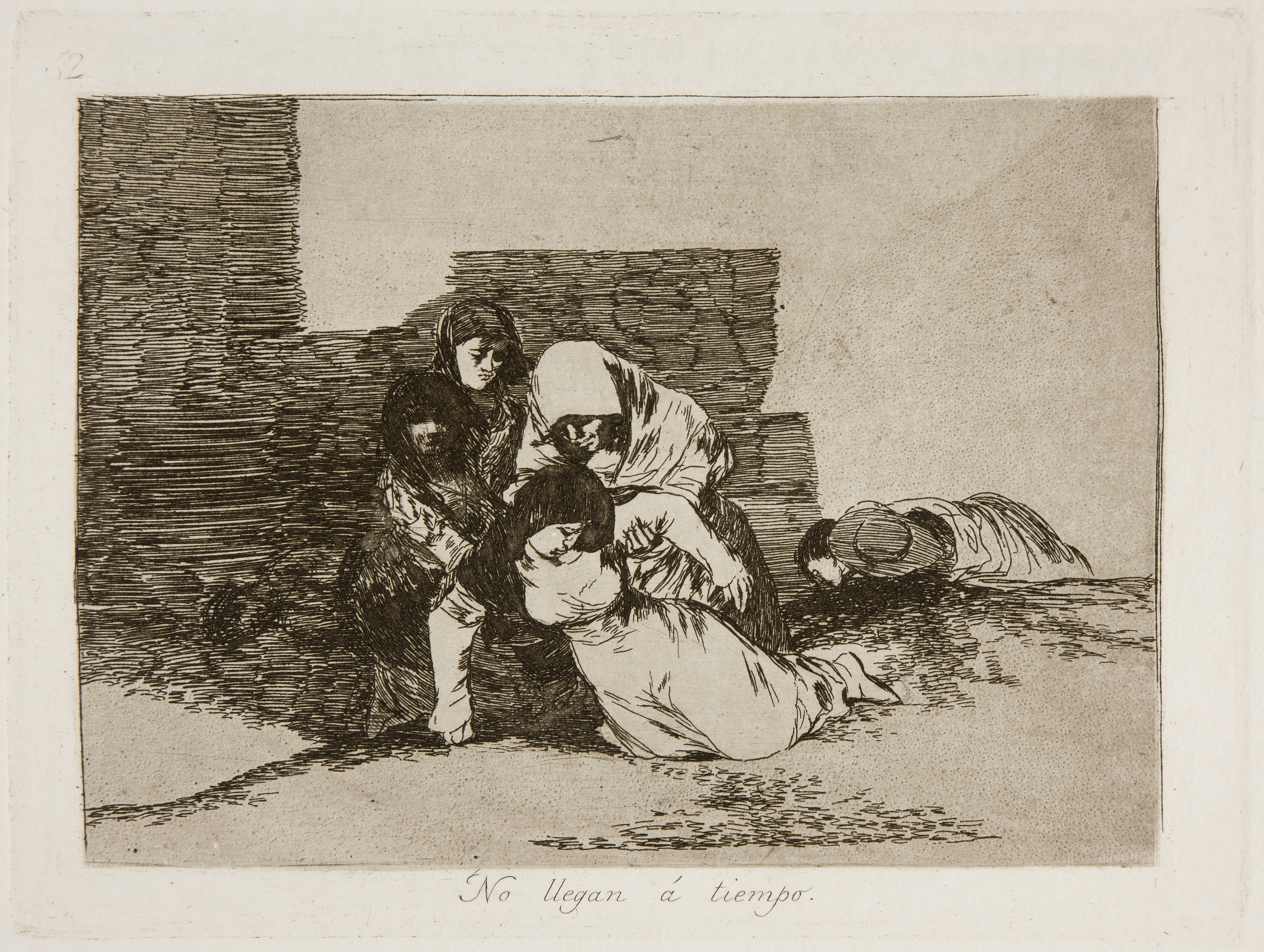
Plate 52: No llegan a tiempo (They do not arrive in time). Two women, one with a child in her arms, huddle behind the ruins of a building to lay a third woman to rest in the ground.

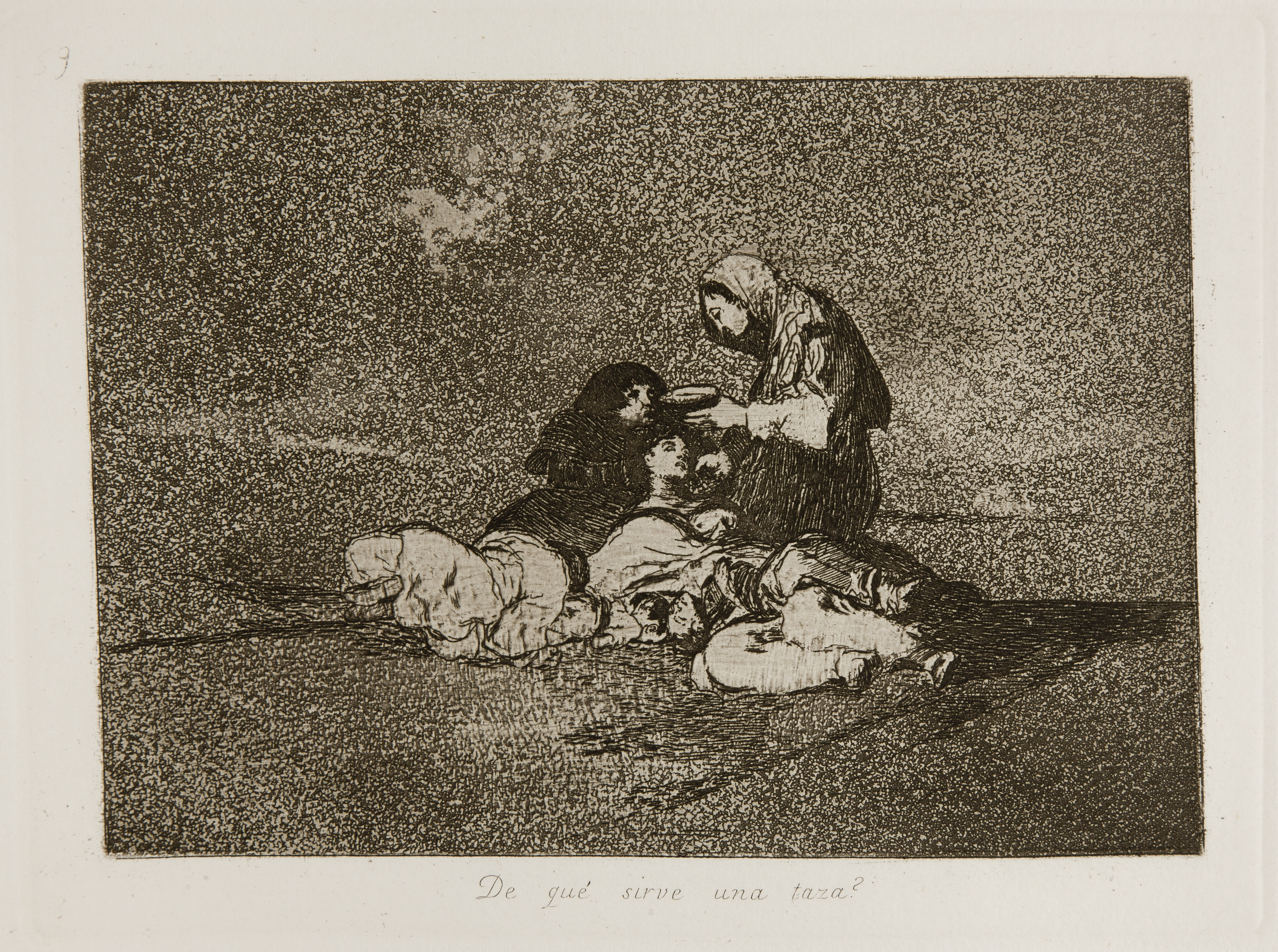
Plate 59: De qué sirve una taza? (What good is a cup?). Two starving women lie on the ground, one near death while a third kneels by their side and offers a cup to the dying woman.

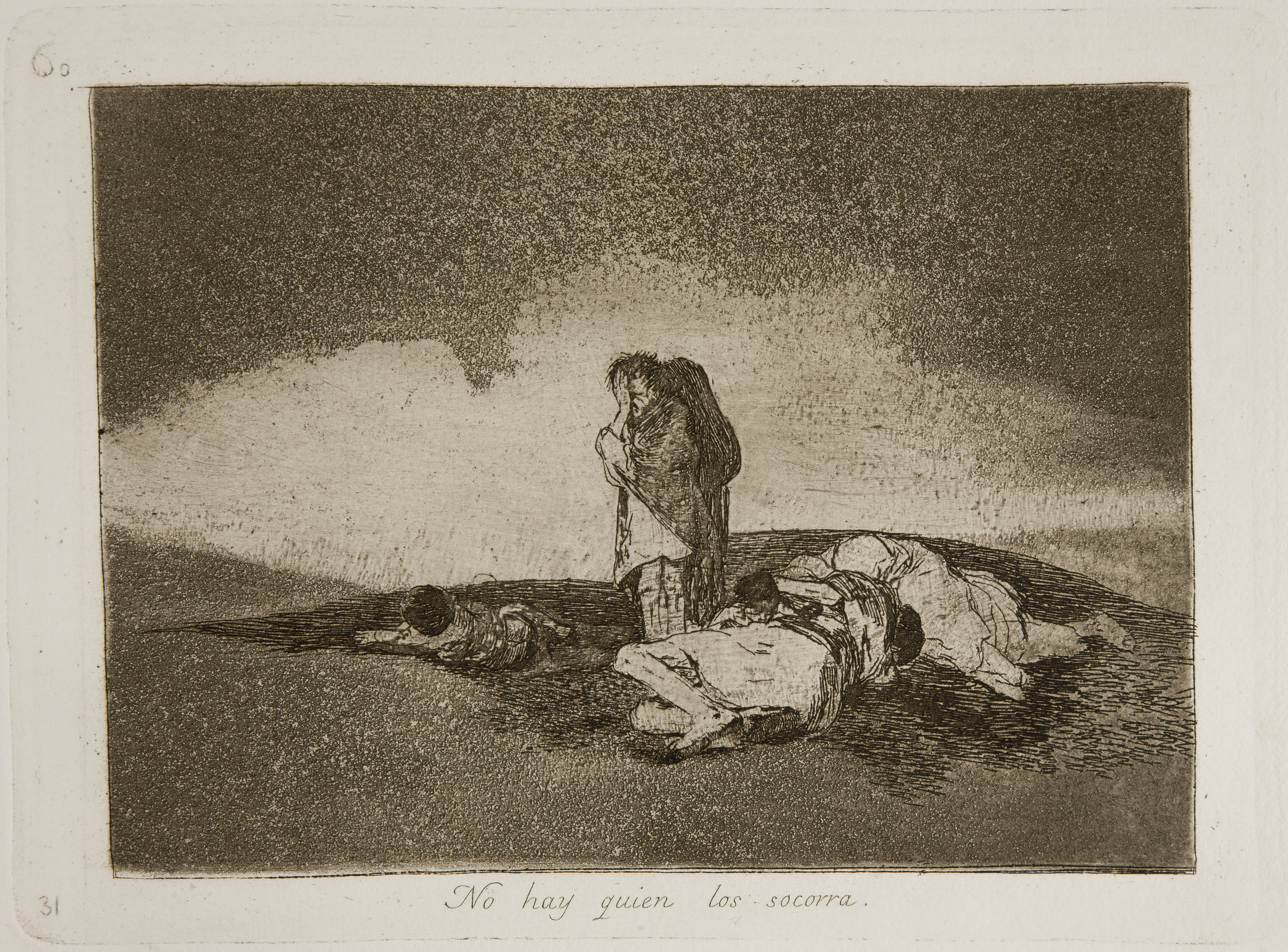
Plate 60: No hay quien los socorra (There is no one to help them). On a hillside, three women lie dead and a lone figure weeps in mournful grief.

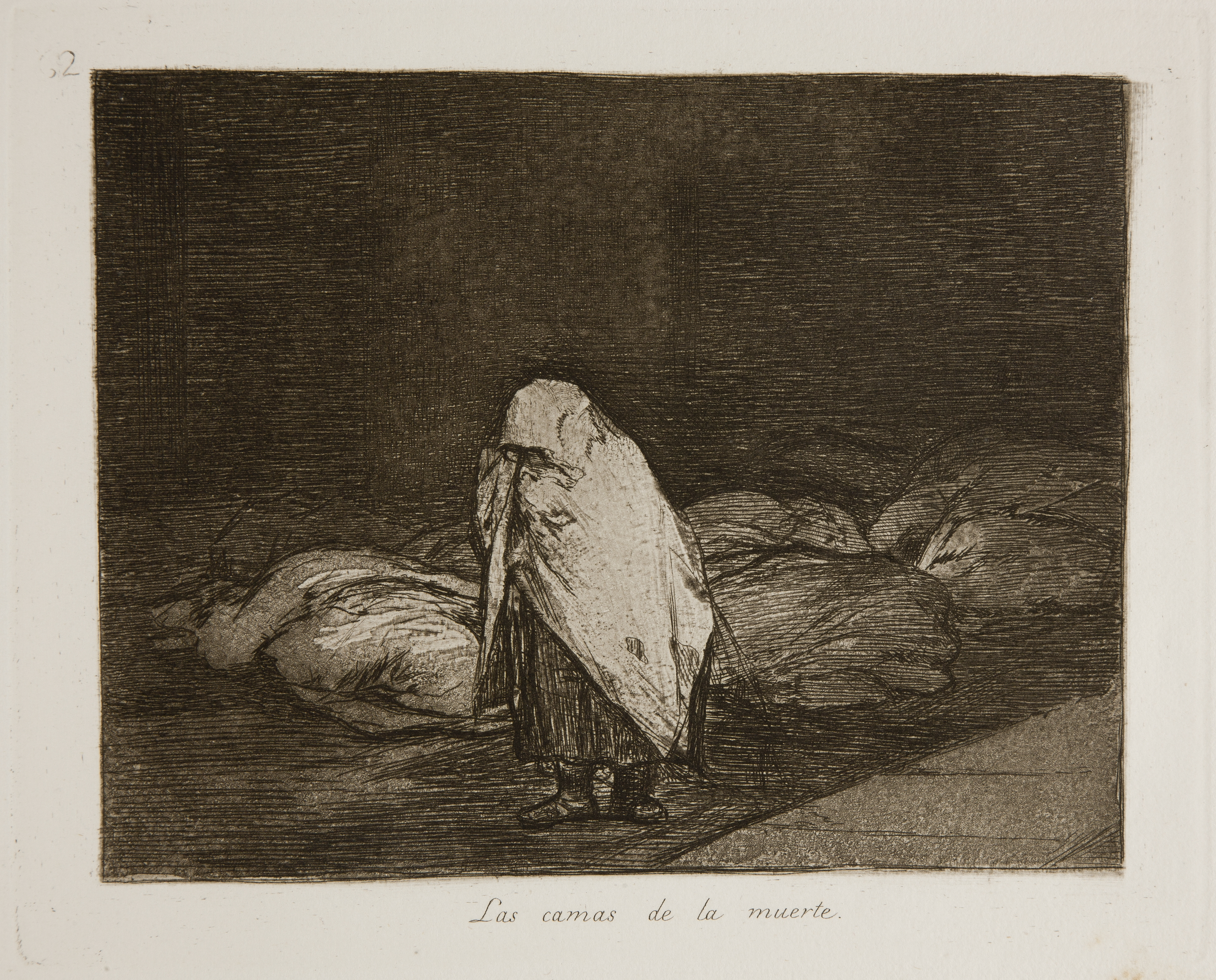
Plate 62: Las camas de la muerte (The beds of death). A woman walks past dozens of wrapped bodies awaiting burial.

The second group, plates 48 to 64, detail the effects of the famine which ravaged Madrid from August 1811 until after Wellington's armies liberated the city in August 1812. Starvation killed 20,000 people in the city that year. In these plates, Goya's focus is directed away from the generalised scenes of slaughter of anonymous, unaligned people in unnamed regions of Spain; he turns towards a specific horror unfolding in Madrid. The famine was a result of many factors. For example, French invaders and Spanish guerrillas and bandits blocked paths and roads into the city, hampering the provision of food.

Goya does not focus on the reasons for the shortage, nor does he apportion blame to any one party. Instead, he is concerned only with its effect on the population. Although the images in the group were based on the experience of Madrid, none of the scenes depict specific events, and there are no identifiable buildings to place the scenes. Goya's focus is on the darkened masses of dead and barely alive bodies, men carrying corpses of women, and bereaved children mourning for lost parents. Hughes believes plate 50, Madre infeliz! (Unhappy mother!), to be the most powerful and poignant of the group. He suggests that the space between the small girl sobbing and the corpse of her mother represents "a darkness that seems to be the very essence of loss and orphanhood". This group of plates was probably completed by early 1814. A scarcity of materials during the famine may have accounted for the freer application of aquatint in these prints; Goya was sometimes forced to use defective plates or reuse old plates after they were burnished.

=== Bourbons and clergy ===
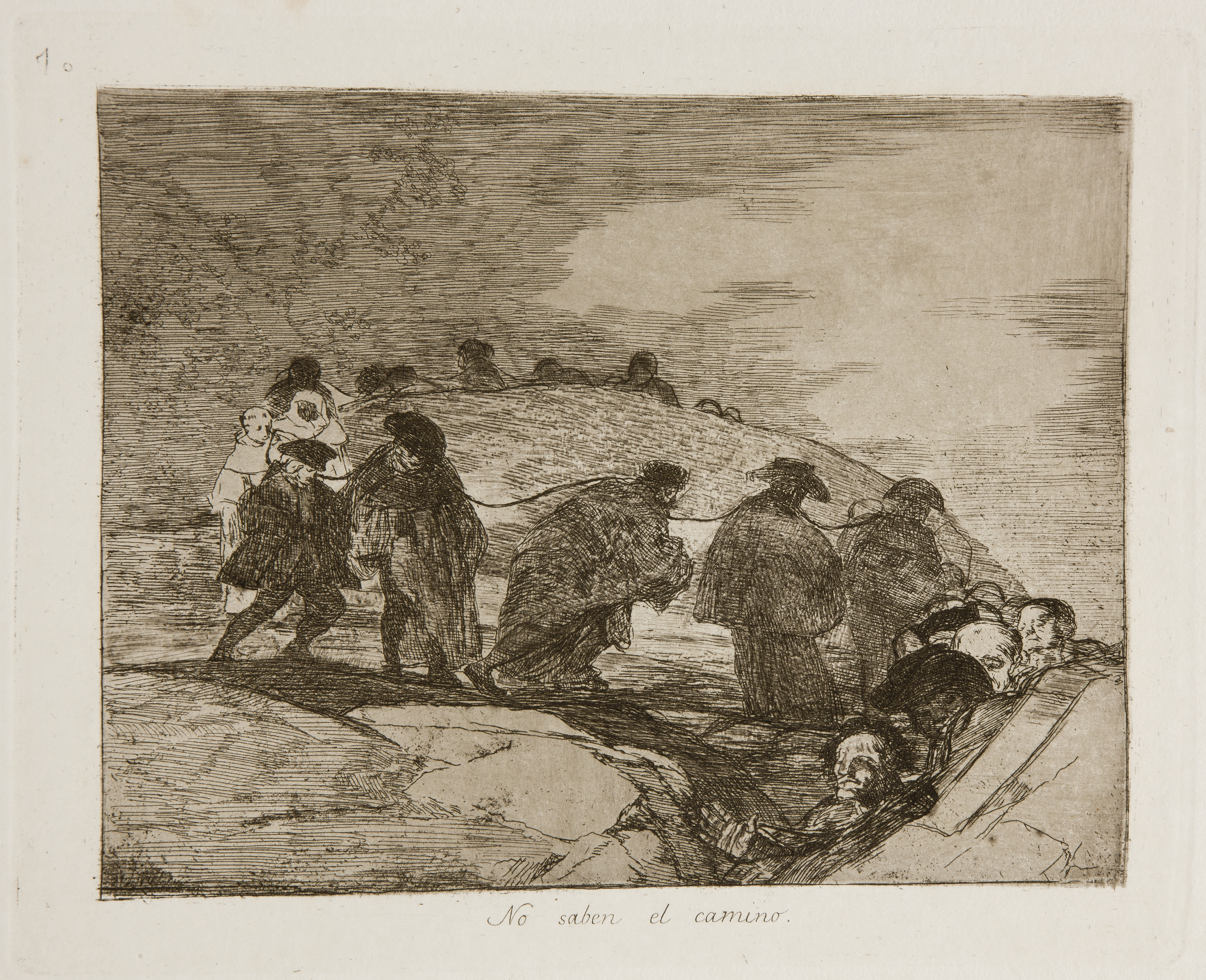
Plate 70: No saben el camino (They do not know the way). A long line of male prisoners extending for a great distance, bound together with rope, walk across a mountainous countryside.

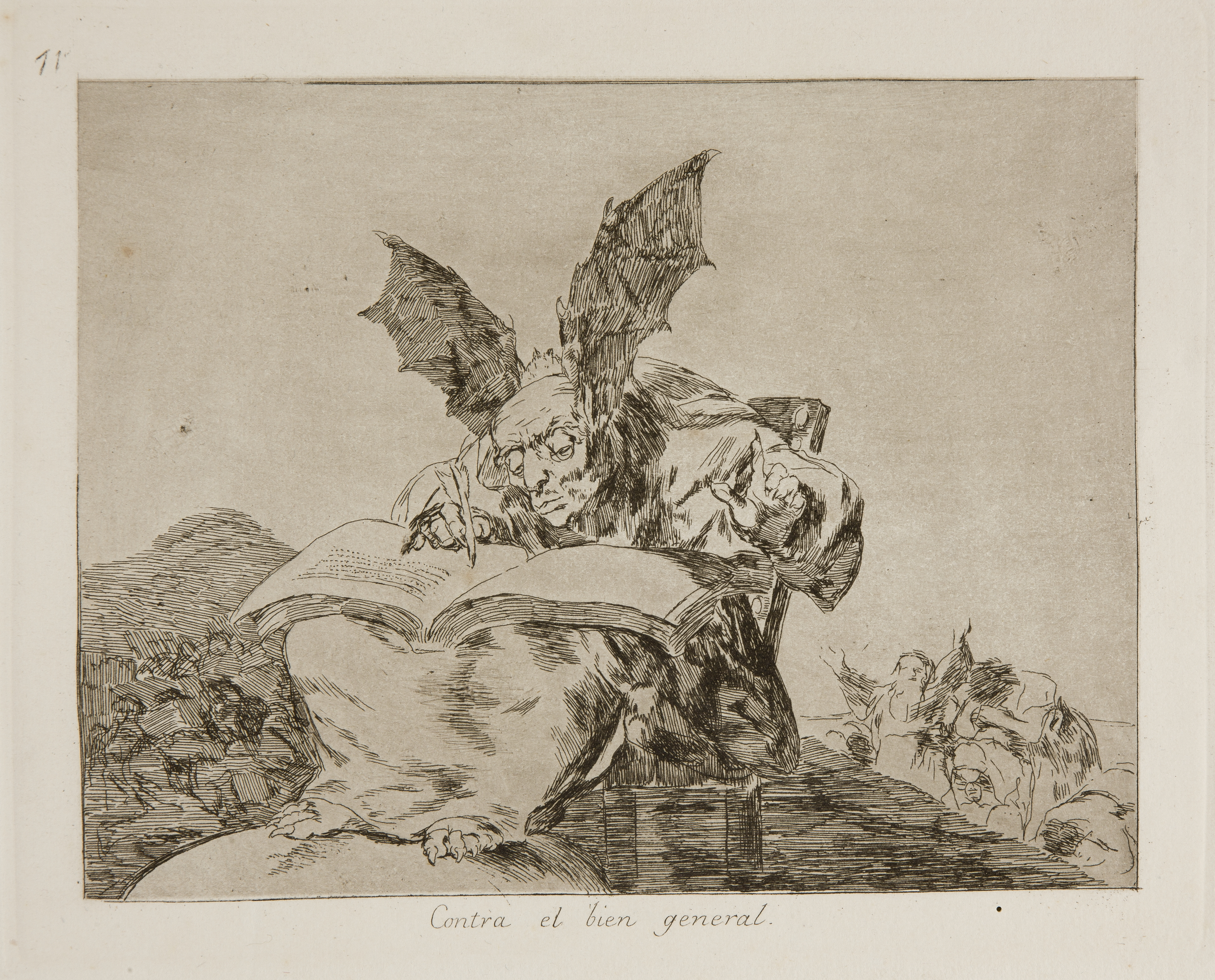
Plate 71: Contra el bien general (Against the common good). A monstrous winged devil sits upon a rock and writes a book, perhaps a book of fate, or a book of evil.

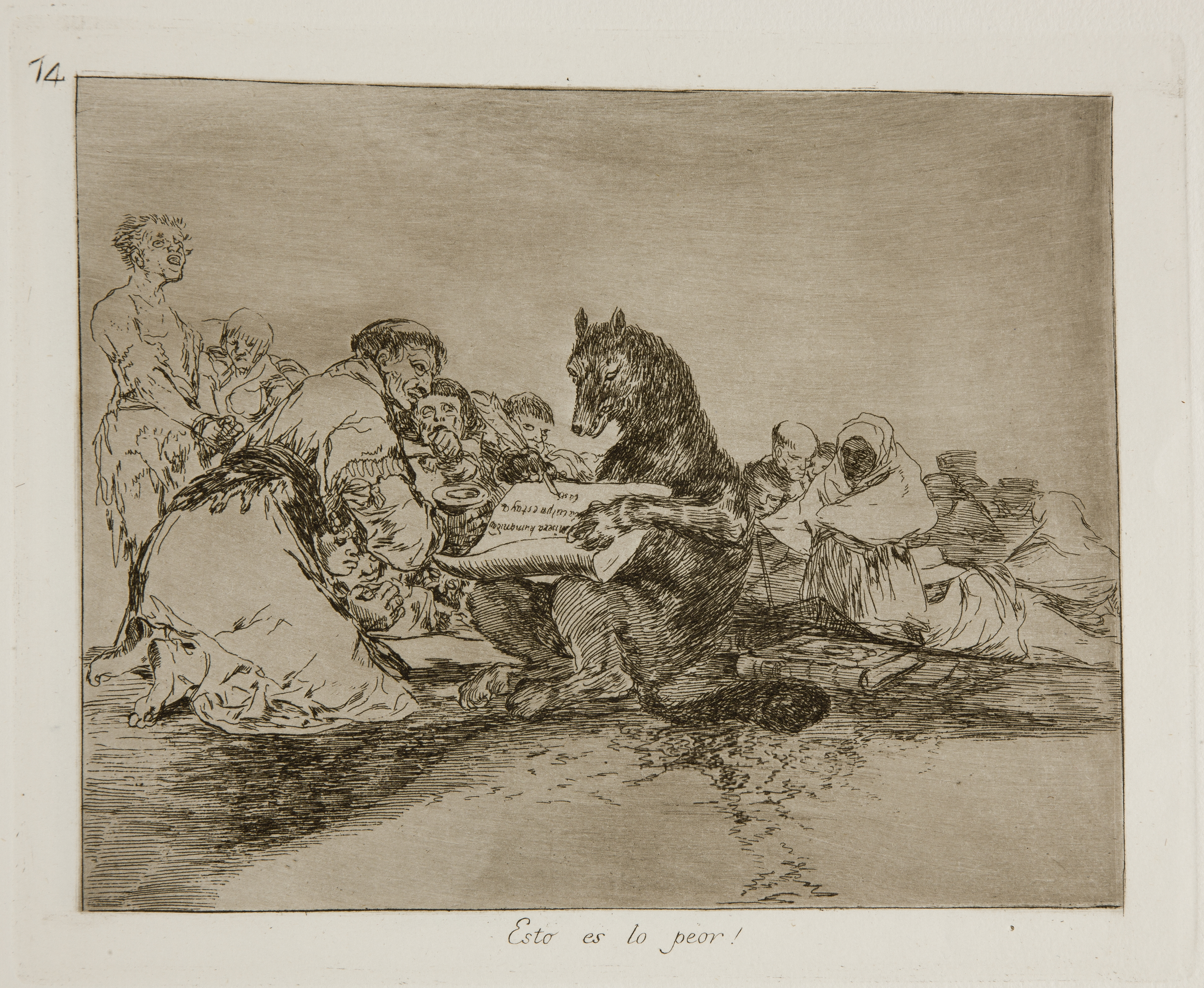
Plate 74: Esto es lo peor! (This is the worst!). A wolf writes orders on a scroll on his lap assisted by a friar. They are giving orders to a long line of suffering, poor, and hungry people.

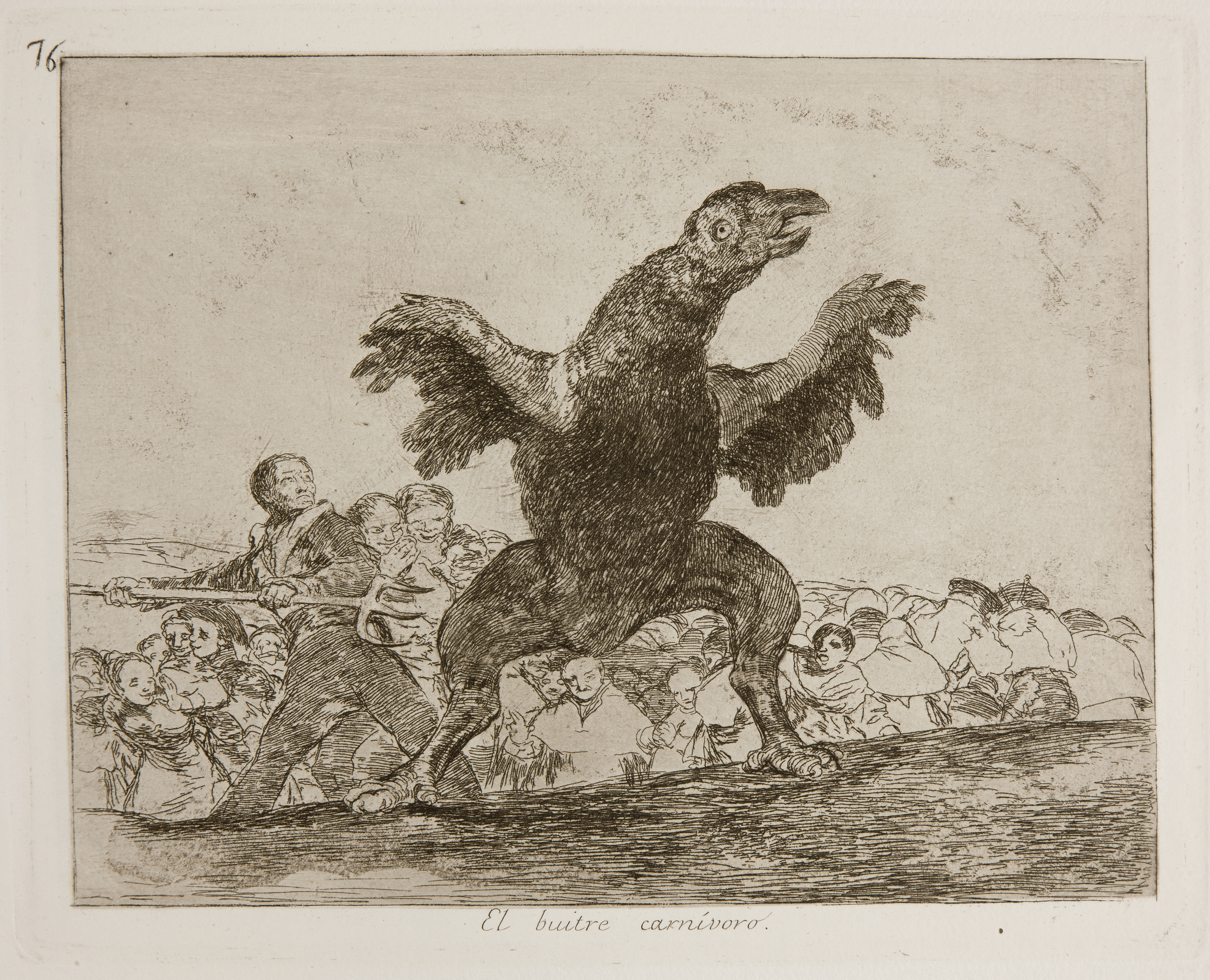
Plate 76: El buitre carnívoro (The flesh-eating vulture). A long line of people are chasing after a gigantic bird.

Plates 65 to 82 were named "caprichos enfáticos" ("emphatic caprices") in the original series title. (Note: "Caprichos enfáticos" is difficult to translate; in the 18th century language of rhetoric, "emphatic" suggests that these prints "make a point or give a warning by insinuation rather than by direct statement"—Wilson-Bareau, 59, quoting from an undisclosed source. Wilson-Bareau adds that "enfáticos" is also often translated as "striking". In talking about art, "Caprice", usually found today as the original Italian capriccio, normally suggests light-hearted fantasy, which does not characterise these prints or Los Caprichos) Completed between 1813 and 1820 and spanning Ferdinand VII's fall and return to power, they consist of allegorical scenes that critique post-war Spanish politics, including the Inquisition and the then-common judicial practice of torture. Although peace was welcomed, it produced a political environment that was in ways more repressive than before. The new regime stifled the hopes of liberals such as Goya, who used the term "fatal consequences" to describe the situation in his title for the series. Hughes refers to the group as the "disasters of peace".

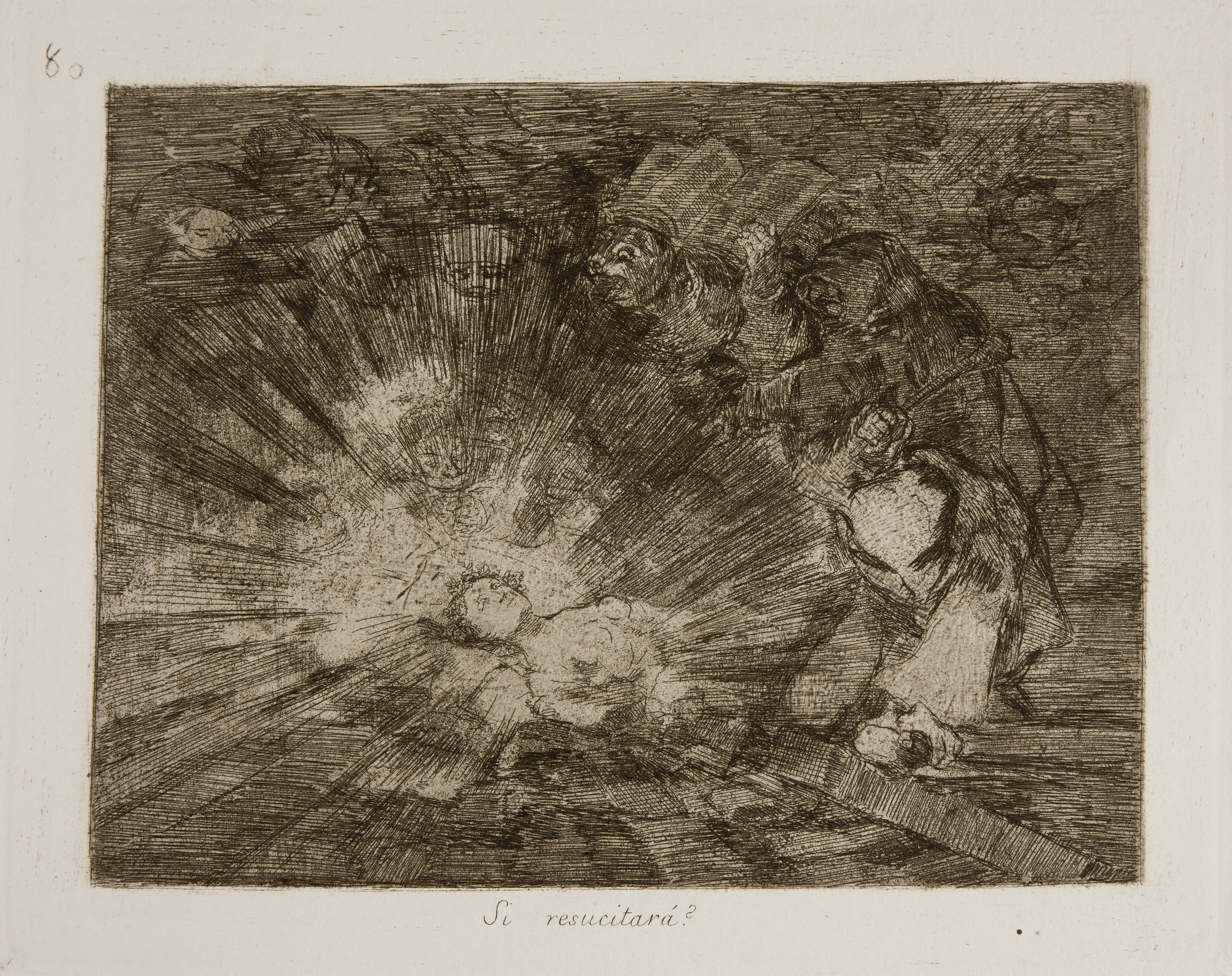
Plate 80: Si resucitará? (Will she live again?) The figure is "Truth", from plate 79. A woman is shown lying on her back, bathed in a halo of light before a gathering mob of hooded monks, while a masked figure beats the ground with a weapon.

After the six years of absolutism that followed Ferdinand's return to the throne on 1 January 1820, Rafael del Riego initiated an army revolt with the intent of restoring the 1812 Constitution. By March, the king was forced to agree, but by September 1823, after an unstable period, a French invasion supported by an alliance of the major powers had removed the constitutional government. The last prints were probably not completed until after the Constitution was restored, though certainly before Goya left Spain in May 1824. Their balance of optimism and cynicism makes it difficult to relate them directly to particular moments in these rapidly moving events.

Many of these images return to the savage burlesque style seen in Goya's earlier Caprichos. Plate 75 Farándula de charlatanes (Troupe of charlatans) shows a priest with a parrot's head performing before an audience of donkeys and monkeys. In plate 77, a pope walking a tightrope was "prudently reduced" to a cardinal or bishop in the print published in 1863. Some prints showing animal scenes seem to draw from a satirical verse fable by Giovanni Battista Casti, published in Italian in 1802; the Animal Farm of its day. In plate 74, the wolf, representing a minister, quotes from the fable—"Miserable humanity, the fault is thine"—and signs with Casti's name. The print "lays the blame for their rulers' barbarity on the victims' own acceptance of it".

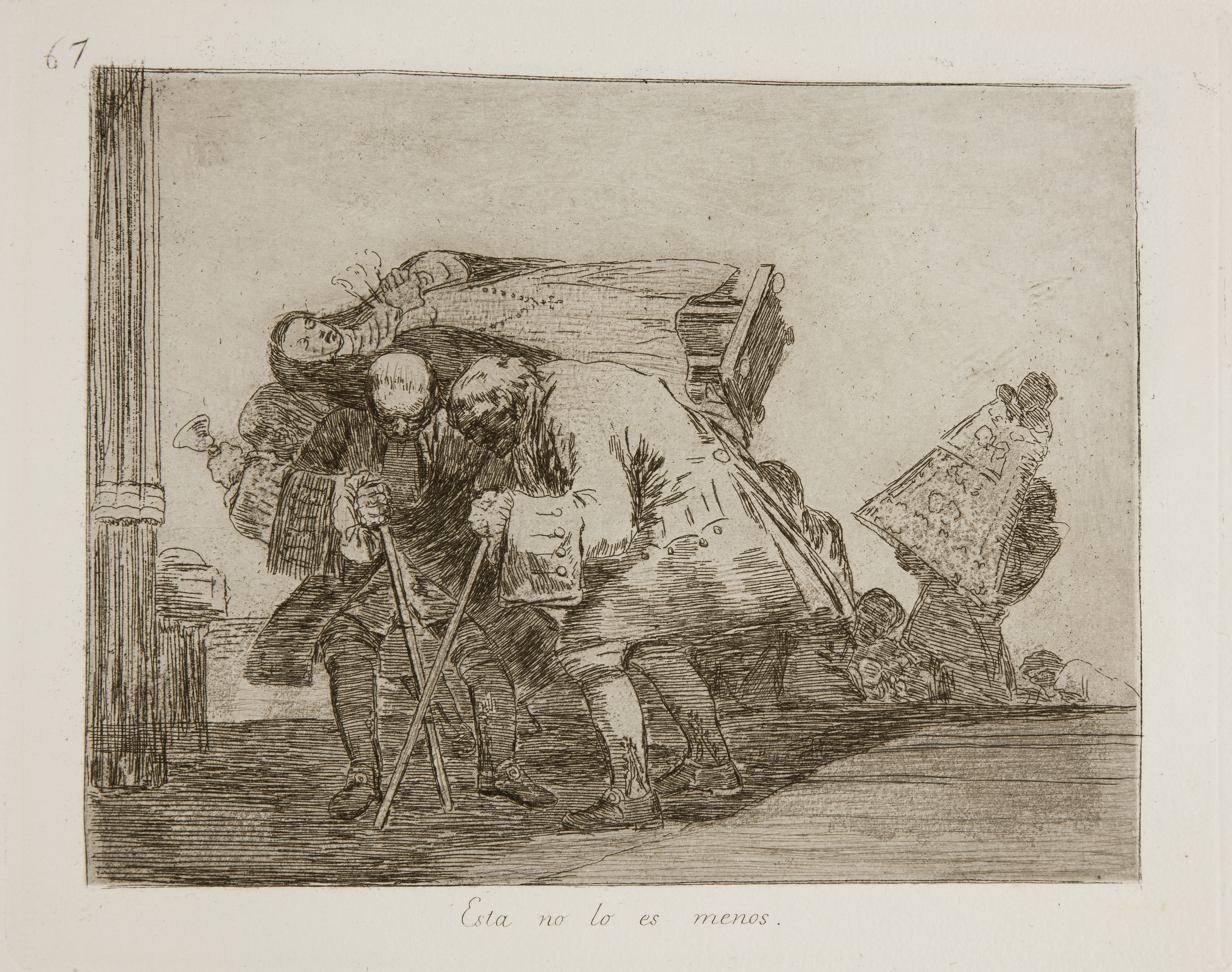
Plate 67: Esta no lo es menos? (This is no less curious)

A number of plates in this group reveal a scepticism towards idolatry of religious images. There are instances in the group where early Christian iconography, in particular statues and processional images, are mocked and denigrated. Plate 67, Esta no lo es menos (This is no less curious), shows two statues carried by two stooped members of the clergy. One statue is recognisable as the "Virgin of Solitude". In Goya's image, the statue is not carried vertically in processional triumph, rather it lies flat and undignified on the backs of the two almost crouched men. Shown horizontally, the object loses its aura and becomes a mere everyday object. Art critics Victor Stoichita and Anna Maria Coderch wrote, "It is in effect a deposed, toppled image, stripped of its powers and its connotations." Goya is making a general statement: that the Church's attempts to support and restore the Bourbons were "illusory, since what they proposed was nothing more than the adoration of an empty form".

The published edition of The Disasters of War ends as it begins; with the portrayal of a single, agonized figure. The last two plates show a woman wearing a wreath, intended as a personification of Spain, Truth, or the Constitution of 1812—which Ferdinand had rejected in 1814. In plate 79, Murió la Verdad (The Truth has died), she lies dead. In plate 80, Si resucitará? (Will she live again?), she is shown lying on her back with breasts exposed, bathed in a halo of light before a mob of "monks and monsters". In plate 82, Esto es lo verdadero (This is the true way), she is again bare-breasted and apparently represents peace and plenty. Here, she lies in front of a peasant. (Note: Of the last two prints, Licht writes, "[Goya's] otherwise authoritative hand begins to hesitate, and he creates the two weakest plates in the entire series. Therein, perhaps, lies his strength: He cannot delude himself." Licht, 158)

== Execution ==
Many of Goya's preparatory drawings, mostly in red chalk, have survived and are numbered differently from the published prints. He produced two albums of proofs—among many individual proof impressions—of which only one is complete. (Note: The most important collection of individual proofs was acquired in Spain by Sir William Stirling-Maxwell, 9th Baronet from Valentín Carderera, who probably got them from Goya's grandson. In 1951, they were sold to the Boston Museum of Fine Arts. Wilson-Bareau, 99. This collection includes a unique unfinished and unpublished print from the first group: Infame provecho (Vile Advantage), Boston MFA Accession number: 51.1697) The full album consists of 85 works, including three small Prisioneros ("Prisoners") made in 1811 which are not part of the series. Goya gave the copy of the full album, now in the British Museum, to his friend Juan Agustín Ceán Bermúdez. It contains a title-page inscription in Goya's hand, is signed at the page edges, and has numbers and titles to the prints written by Goya. These were copied on the plates when the published edition was prepared in 1863. By then, 80 had passed from Goya's son, Javier—who had stored them in Madrid after his father left Spain—to the Real Academia de Bellas Artes de San Fernando (Royal Academy of Fine Arts of San Fernando), of which Goya had been director. Comparison of the Ceán proof set and the engraved captions reveal changes to the inscriptions in factors such as spelling, punctuation and phrasing. These modifications sometimes affected the accompanying scene's meaning or impact, such as in Plate 36: in all printed editions, the title is given as 'Tampoco' ('Not in this case either'), while in the proof series it is written as 'Tan poco' ('So little'). Numbers 81 and 82 of the series rejoined the others in the academy in 1870, and were not published until 1957. Goya's title for the series in the Ceán album, was Fatal consequences of the bloody war in Spain with Bonaparte. Its subsequent shortening to Los Desastres de la Guerra was presumably an allusion to Jacques Callot's series Les misères de la Guerre.

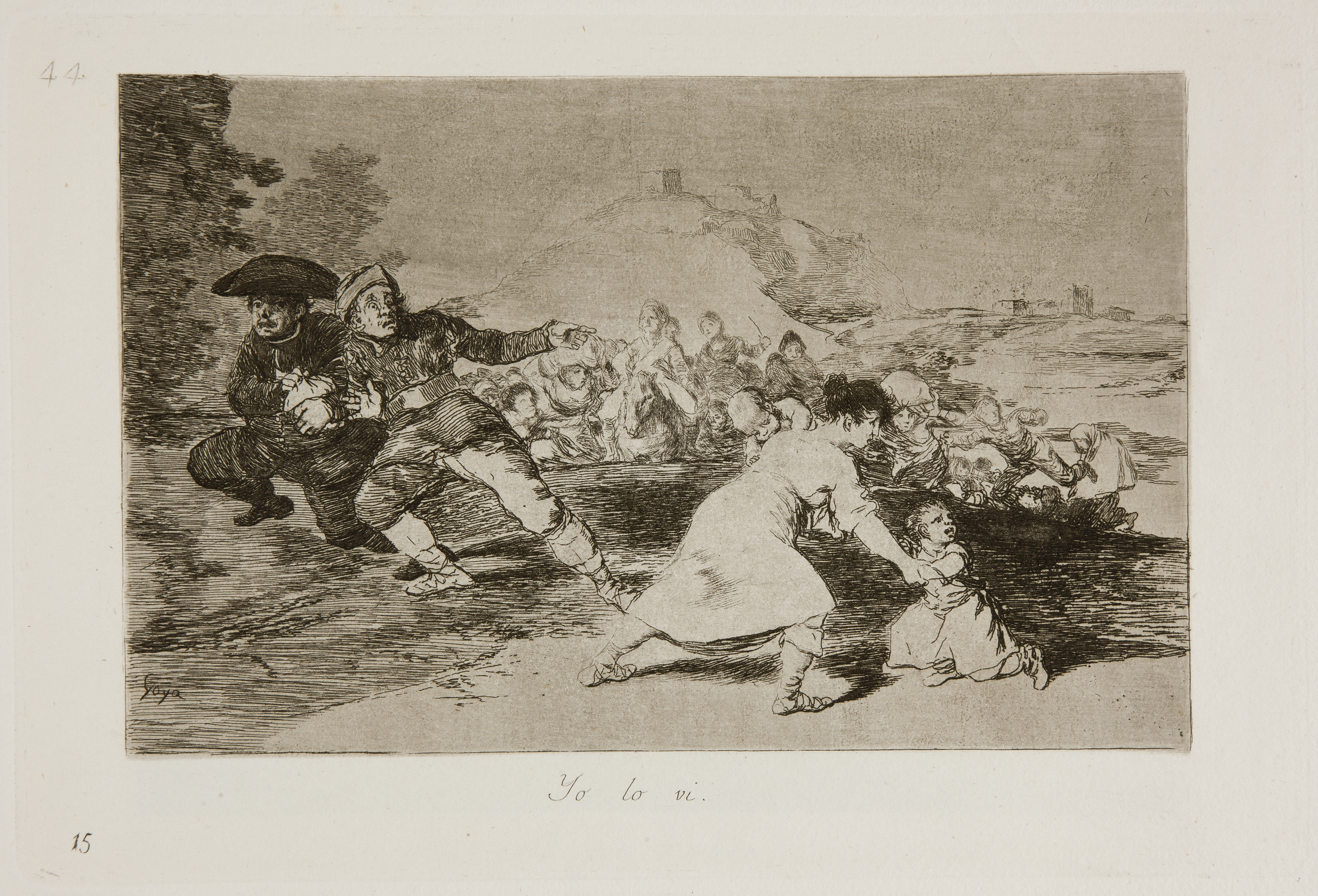
Plate 44: Yo lo vi (I saw this) from the published edition, with surface tone over the landscape, sky, and woman's dress. In the proofs printed under Goya's supervision, there is no tone.

As the series progressed, Goya evidently began to experience shortages of good quality paper and copper plates and was forced to take what art historian Juliet Wilson-Bareau calls the "drastic step" of destroying two etched and aquatinted landscapes, likely from the first years of the century, from which very few impressions had been printed. These were cut in half to produce four of The Disasters of War's prints. Partly because of the material shortages, the sizes and shapes of the plates vary somewhat, ranging from as small as 142 × 168 mm (5.6 × 6.6 in) to as large as 163 × 260 mm (6.4 × 10.2 in). (Note: Plates 14 and 24, respectively. See the Spanish National Library website for measurements.)

Goya completed 56 plates during the war against France, and these are often viewed as eye-witness accounts. A final batch—including plate 1, several in the middle of the series, and the last 17 plates—are likely to have been produced after the end of the war, when materials were more abundant. The titles of some plates, written beneath each, indicate his presence: I saw this (plate 44) and One can not look (plate 26). While it is unclear how much of the conflict Goya witnessed, it is generally accepted that he observed first-hand many of the events recorded in the first two groups. A number of other scenes are known to have been related to him second hand. It is known that he used a sketchbook when visiting battle sites; at his studio, he set to work on copper plate once he had absorbed and assimilated meaning from his sketches. All drawings are from the same paper, and all the copper plates are uniform.

The titles of a number of scenes link pairs or larger groups, even if the scenes themselves are not related. Examples include plates 2 and 3 (With or without reason and The same), 4 and 5 (The women are courageous and And they are fierce), and 9, 10 and 11 (They do not want to, Nor these and Or these). Other plates show scenes from the same story or incident, as in plates 46 and 47 (This is bad and This is how it happened), in which a monk is murdered by French soldiers looting church treasures; a rare sympathetic image of the clergy, who are generally shown to be on the side of oppression and injustice.

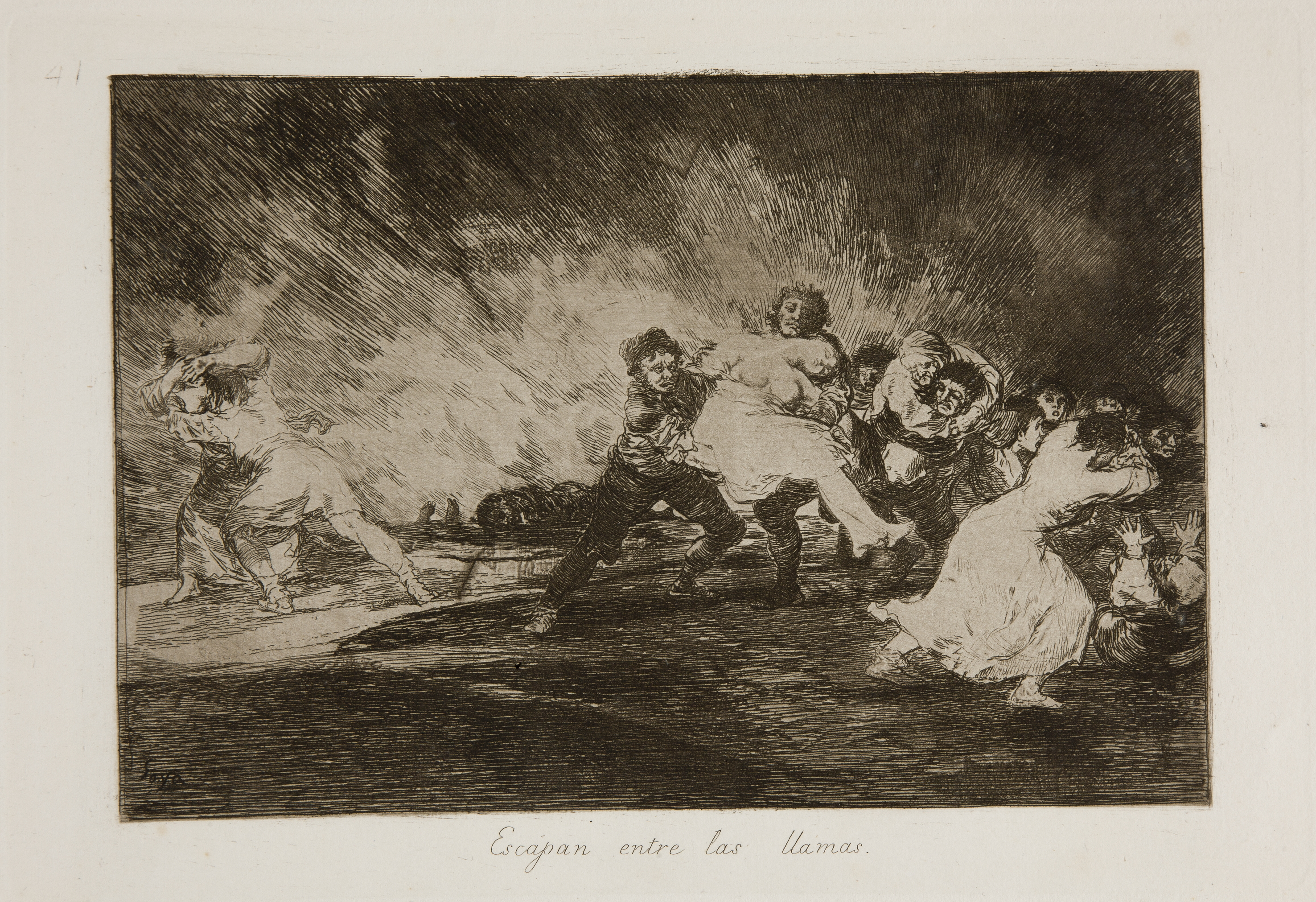
Plate 41: Escapan entre las llamas (They escape among the flames). Men and women some carrying each other run into the night, amidst chaos and terror.

The Bermúdez set is considered "uniquely important ... because it shows the series as Goya must have intended to publish it, and the way he intended the plates to be printed". There is therefore a distinction between the published edition of 1863, with 80 plates, and the full series in the album, which contains 82 (ignoring the three small Prisioneros). The Bermúdez album was borrowed by the Academy for the 1863 edition. The original titles or captions were etched onto the plates, even with Goya's spelling mistakes. One title was changed, (Note: The title of plate 69 was altered as "apparently ... too nihilistic" from Goya's Nada. Ello lo dice to Nada. Ello dirá (Wilson-Bareau, 57).) one plate had work added and, unlike the proofs, the printing was carried out selectively not wiping ink from areas of the surface of the plates, producing "surface tone", in accordance with mid-century taste.

Goya mostly used the tonal technique of aquatint, in which he became very skilled in producing dramatic contrasts, fully satisfying his needs for tonal effects. Reflecting the mid-19th century taste for a "rich overall tone", the 1863 edition took the "disastrous" decision to make considerable use of surface tone, which is not seen in the few early impressions made by Goya himself. Instead of the "luminosity and delicacy" of these, the later editions "provide a dulled and distorted reflection of the artist's intentions", according to Juliet Wilson Bareau.

The Disasters of War was not published during Goya's lifetime, possibly because he feared political repercussions from Fernando VII's repressive regime. (Note: It has been suggested that Goya numbered the initial set of 56 plates in 1814, during a few months of national optimism following the end of the war, with the intent of publishing them then. However, on 11 May 1814, Fernando VII declared that the war would be forgotten and nullified the constitution, making publication impossible (Sayre, 128–129).) Some art historians suggest that he did not publish because he was sceptical about the use of images for political motives, and instead saw them as a personal meditation and release. Most, however, believe the artist preferred to wait until they could be made public without censorship. (Note: Licht speculates, "These plates obviously had to be created by the artist without any further thought about their ultimate purpose. Goya never intended them for publication during his lifetime." (Licht, 128). Wilson-Bareau and Hughes disagree, see Wilson-Bareau p. 59 and passim in chapter 4.) A further four editions were published, the last in 1937, so that in total over 1,000 impressions of each print have been printed, though not all of the same quality. As with his other series, later impressions show wear to the aquatint. The 1863 edition had 500 impressions, and editions followed in 1892 (100) before which the plates were probably steel-faced to prevent further wear, 1903 (100), 1906 (275), and 1937. Many sets have been broken up, and most print room collections will have at least some of the set. Examples, especially from later editions, are available on the art market.

In 1873, Spanish novelist Antonio de Trueba published the purported reminiscences of Goya's gardener, Isidro, on the genesis of the series. de Trueba claims to have spoken to Isidro in 1836, when the gardener recalled accompanying Goya to the hill of Principe Pio to sketch the victims of the executions of 3 May 1808. (Note: "As midnight approached, my master said, 'Isidro, take your gun and come with me.' I obeyed him and where do you think we went?—To that hill where the bodies of those poor people still lay .... My master opened his portfolio, put it on his lap and waited for the moon to come out from behind the large cloud that was hiding it .... At last the moon shone so brightly that it seemed like daylight. Amidst the pools of blood, we could make out some of the corpses—some lying on their backs, others on their bellies; this one in a kneeling position, that one with his arms raised toward heaven, begging for vengeance or mercy .... While I stared at the terrible scene, filled with dread, my master drew it. We returned home and the next morning my master showed me his first print of La Guerra, which I looked at in horror. 'Sir,' I asked him, 'Why do you draw these barbarities which men commit?' He replied, 'To warn men not to be barbarians ever again.' "Ferrari, Enrique Lafuente; Licht et al, 82–83) Goya scholars are sceptical of the account; Nigel Glendinning described it as a "romantic fantasy", and detailed its many inaccuracies. (Note: In a BBC television documentary, Glendinning said: "Trueba is clearly romanticising the artist, making the artist fearless and heroic, I mean not to just observe through the spyglass these terrible things that are happening, but actually going to see them ... None of this corresponds at all to the reality of the shootings. Because we know the shootings took place at four or five o'clock in the morning. Some modern experts point out it was also raining, and so the idea that Goya is going out at midnight, he's not going to see anything. None of this fits with historical information we have." Glendinning also pointed out that Trueba places Goya in his house known as Quinta del Sordo. Goya moved into this house in 1819, after the war, casting further doubt on Trueba's version. See The Private Life of a Masterpiece: The Third of May, 1808, Tx BBC2, 26 January 2004; released on DVD by 2 Entertain Video, 2007.)

== Technique and style ==
Detailing and protesting the ugliness of life is a common theme throughout the history of Spanish art, from the dwarves of Diego Velázquez to Pablo Picasso's Guernica (1937). Reflecting on The Disasters of War, biographer Margherita Abbruzzese notes that Goya asks that the truth "be seen and ... shown to others; including those who have no wish to see it .... And the blind in spirit stay their eyes on the outward aspect of things, then these outward aspects must be twisted and deformed until they cry out what they are trying to say." It is believed Goya owned a copy of a famous set of 18 etchings by Jacques Callot known as Les Grandes Misères de la guerre (1633) which record the devastating impact on Lorraine of Louis XIII's troops during the Thirty Years' War.

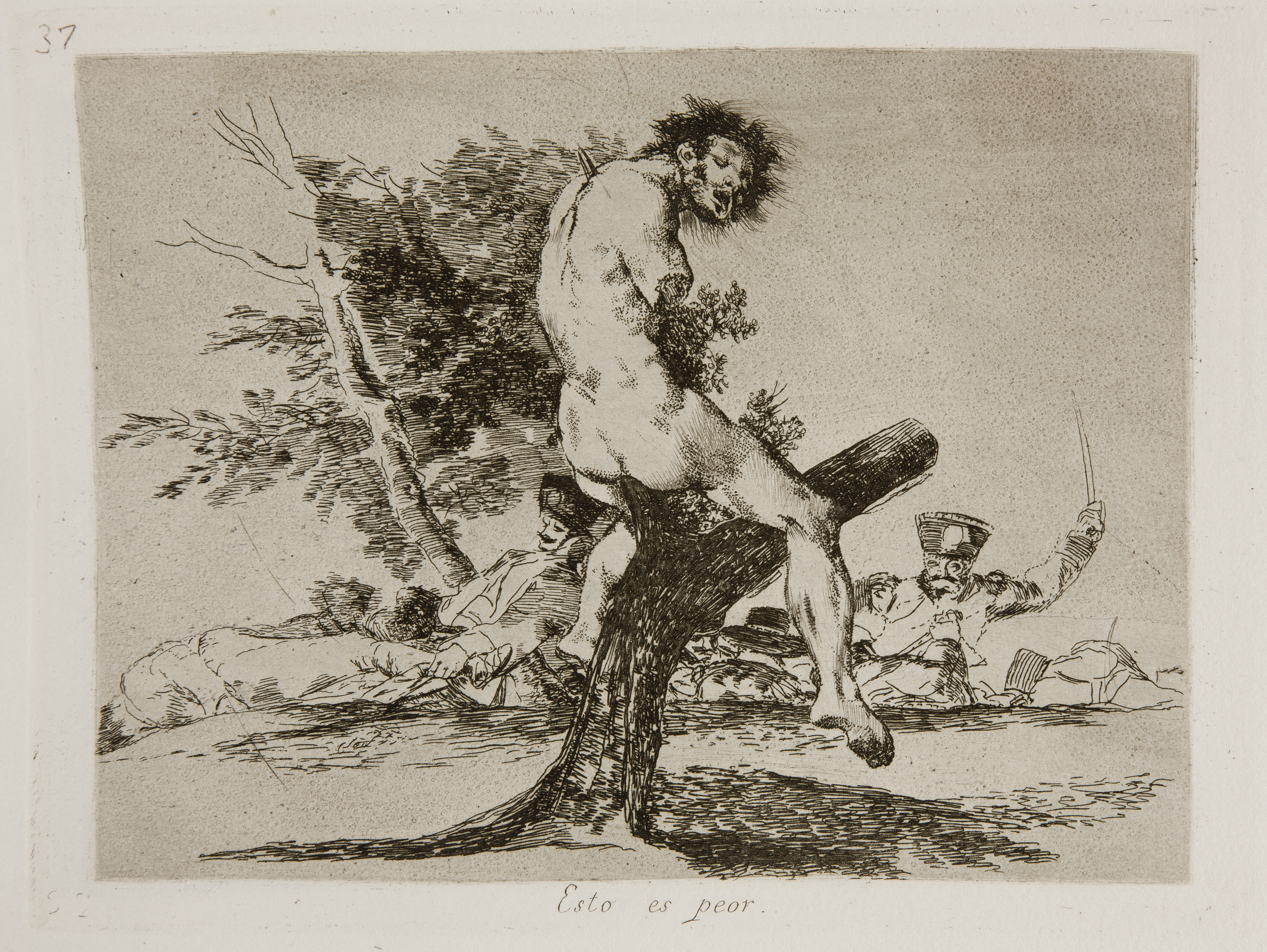
Plate 37: Esto es peor (This is worse). In the aftermath of battle, the mutilated torsos and limbs of civilian victims were mounted on trees, like "fragments of marble sculpture".

The dead man in plate 37, Esto es peor (This is worse), shows the mutilated body of a Spanish fighter spiked on a tree, surrounded by the corpses of French soldiers. It is based in part on the Hellenistic fragment of a male nude, the Belvedere Torso by the Athenian "Apollonios son of Nestor". Goya had earlier made a black wash drawing study of the statue during a visit to Rome. In Esto es peor he subverts the classical motifs used in war art through his addition of a degree of black theatre—the branch piercing the body through the anus, twisted neck and close framing. The man is naked; a daring factor for Spanish art in the 19th century, during the time of the Spanish Inquisition. Art critic Robert Hughes remarked that the figures in this image "remind us that, if only they had been marble and the work of their destruction had been done by time rather than sabres, neo-classicists like Mengs would have been in aesthetic raptures over them."

Goya abandons colour in the series, believing that light, shade and shadow provide a more direct expression of the truth. He wrote, "In art there is no need for colour. Give me a crayon and I will 'paint' your portrait." He uses line not so much to delineate shape but, according to art historian Anne Hollander, "to scratch forms into existence and then splinter them, as a squinting, half blind eye might apprehend them, to create the distorting visual detritus that shudders around the edge of things seen in agonized haste .... This 'graphic' kind of clarity can be most sharp when it is most jagged." The immediacy of the approach suited his desire to convey the primitive side of man's nature. Rembrandt had sought a similar directness, but did not have access to aquatint. William Blake and Henry Fuseli, contemporaries of Goya's, produced works with similarly fantastical content, but, as Hollander describes, they muted its disturbing impact with "exquisitely applied linearity ... lodging it firmly in the safe citadels of beauty and rhythm."

In his 1947 book on Goya's etchings, English author Aldous Huxley observed that the images depict a recurrent series of pictorial themes: darkened archways "more sinister than those even of Piranesi's Prisons"; street corners as settings for the cruelty of the disparities of class; and silhouetted hilltops carrying the dead, sometimes featuring a single tree serving as gallows or repository for dismembered corpses. "And so the record proceeds, horror after horror, unalleviated by any of the splendors which other painters have been able to discover in war; for, significantly, Goya never illustrates an engagement, never shows us impressive masses of troops marching in column or deployed in the order of battle .... All he shows us is war's disasters and squalors, without any of the glory or even picturesqueness."

The Disasters of War is the second of Goya's four major print series, which constitute almost all of his most important work in the medium. He also created 35 prints early in his career—many of which are reproductions of his portraits and other works—and about 16 lithographs while living in France. His first series, the 80-plate Caprichos, were completed between 1797 and 1799 to document "the innumerable foibles and follies to be found in any civilized society, and ... the common prejudices and deceitful practices which custom, ignorance, or self-interest have made usual." Caprichos was put on sale in 1799, but was almost immediately withdrawn after threats from the Inquisition. In The Disasters of War's first two groups of prints, Goya largely departs from the imaginative, synthetic approach of Caprichos to realistically depict life-and-death scenes of war. In the last group, the Caprichos sense of the fantastic returns.

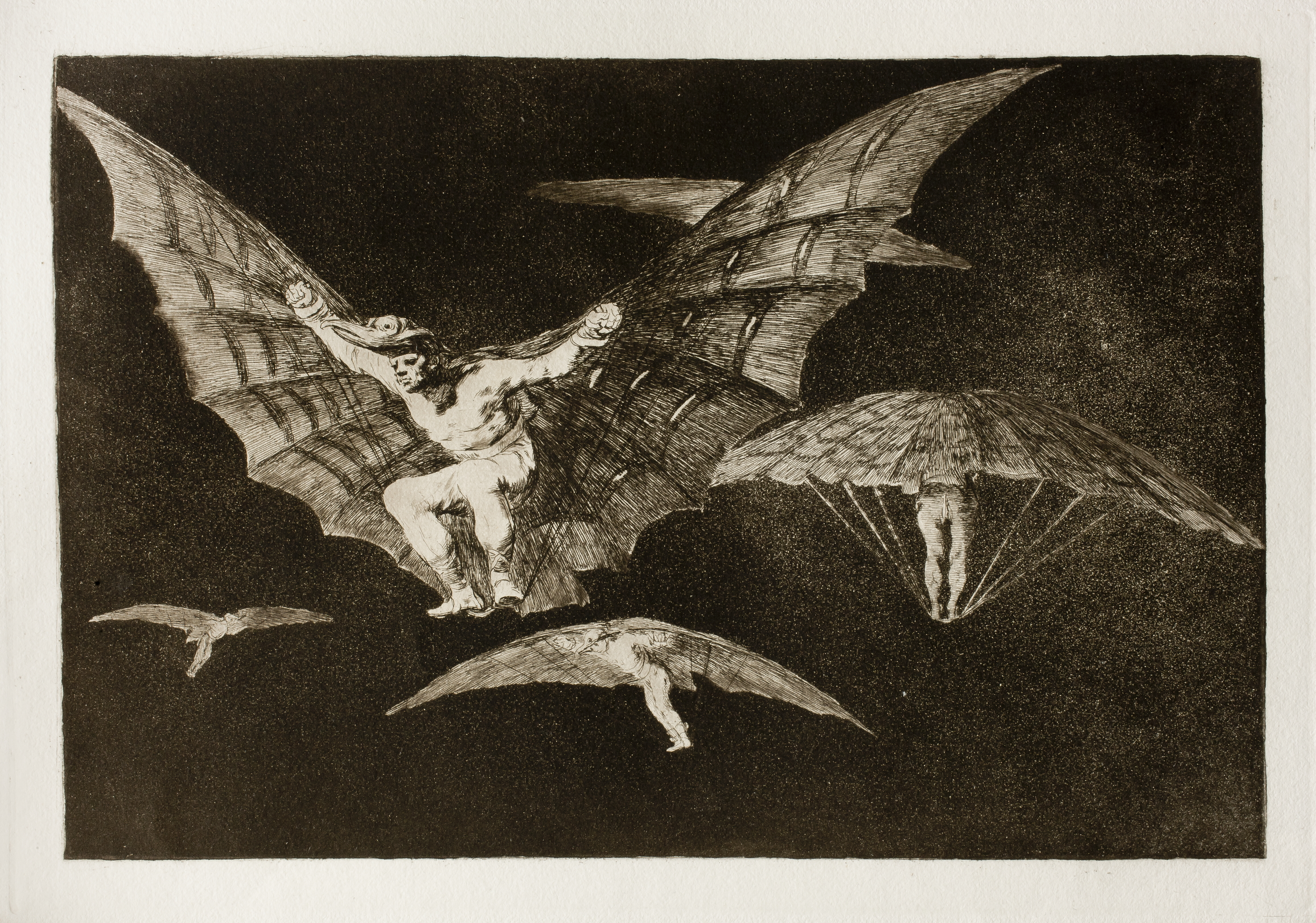
Plate 13 from the "Disparate" series; Modo de volar (Way to fly), 1816–1823. In the third grouping of plates in The Disasters of War Goya returned in part to the fantastical imagery he had explored in the Caprichos.

Between 1815 and 1816, Goya produced the Tauromachia, a series of 33 bullfighting scenes, during a break from The Disasters of War. Tauromachia was not politically sensitive, and was published at the end of 1816 in an edition of 320—for sale individually or in sets—without incident. It did not meet with critical or commercial success. While in France, Goya completed a set of four larger lithographs, Los toros de Burdeos (The Bulls of Bordeaux). His final series, known as Los Disparates (The Follies), Proverbios (Proverbs), or Sueños (Dreams), contains 22 large plates and at least five drawings that are seemingly part of the series but which were never etched. All these were left in Madrid—apparently incomplete and with only a handful of proofs printed—when Goya went to France in 1823. One plate is known to have been etched in 1816, but little else is established about the chronology of the works or Goya's plans for the set.

Goya worked on The Disasters of War during a period when he was producing images more for his own satisfaction than for any contemporary audience. (Note: Goya's introspection late in this period can be witnessed in the enigmatic Black Paintings which he painted directly onto the walls of his house between 1819 and 1823.) His work came to rely less on historical incidents than his own imagination. Many of the later plates contain fantastical motifs which can be seen as a return to the imagery of the Caprichos. In this, he is relying on visual clues derived from his inner life, rather than anything that could be recognised from real events or settings.

== Interpretation ==
In The Disasters of War, Goya does not excuse any purpose to the random slaughter—the plates are devoid of the consolation of divine order or the dispensation of human justice. This in part a result of the absence of melodrama or consciously artful presentation that would distance the viewer from the brutality of the subjects, as found in Baroque martyrdom. In addition, Goya refuses to offer the stability of traditional narrative. Instead, his composition tends to highlight the most disturbing aspects of each work.

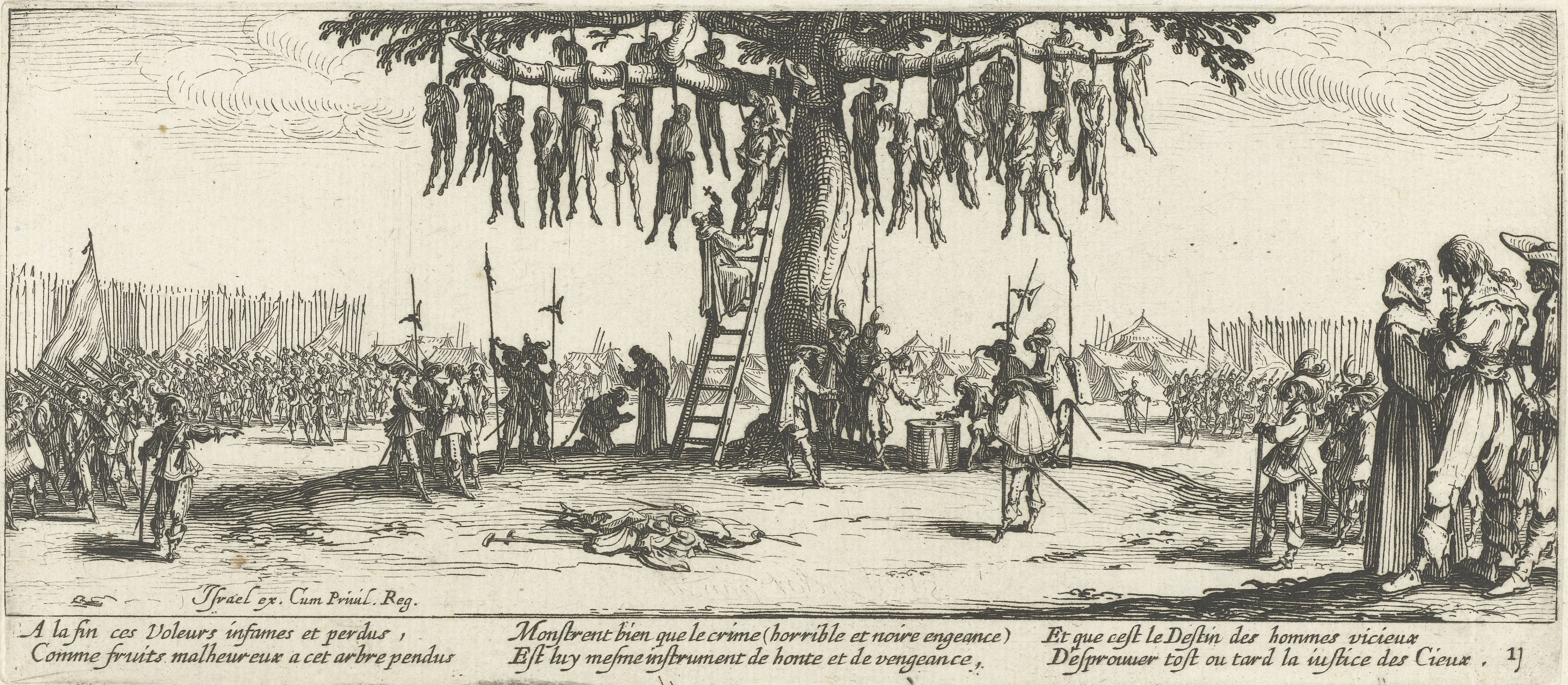
La Pendaison (The Hanging), a plate from French artist Jacques Callot's 1633 series Les Grandes Misères de la guerre. It is likely that Callot's etchings of a disorderly army were an influence on Goya.

The plates are set spaces without fixed boundaries; the mayhem extends outside the frames of the picture plane in all directions. Thus, they express the randomness of violence, and in their immediacy and brutality they have been described as analogous to 19th- and 20th-century photojournalism. According to Robert Hughes, as with Goya's earlier Caprichos series, The Disasters of War is likely to have been intended as a "social speech"; satires on the then prevailing "hysteria, evil, cruelty and irrationality [and] the absence of wisdom" of Spain under Napoleon, and later the Inquisition. It is evident Goya viewed the Spanish war with disillusionment, and despaired both for the violence around him and for the loss of a liberal ideal he believed was being replaced by a new militant unreason. Hughes believed Goya's decision to render the images through etchings, which by definition are absent of colour, indicates feelings of utter hopelessness.

His message late in life is contrary to the humanistic view of man as essentially good but easily corrupted. He seems to be saying that violence is innate in man, "forged in the substance of what, since Freud, we have called the id." Hughes believed that in the end, there is only the violated emptiness of acceptance of our fallen nature: like the painting of Goya's dog, "whose master is as absent from him as God is from Goya."

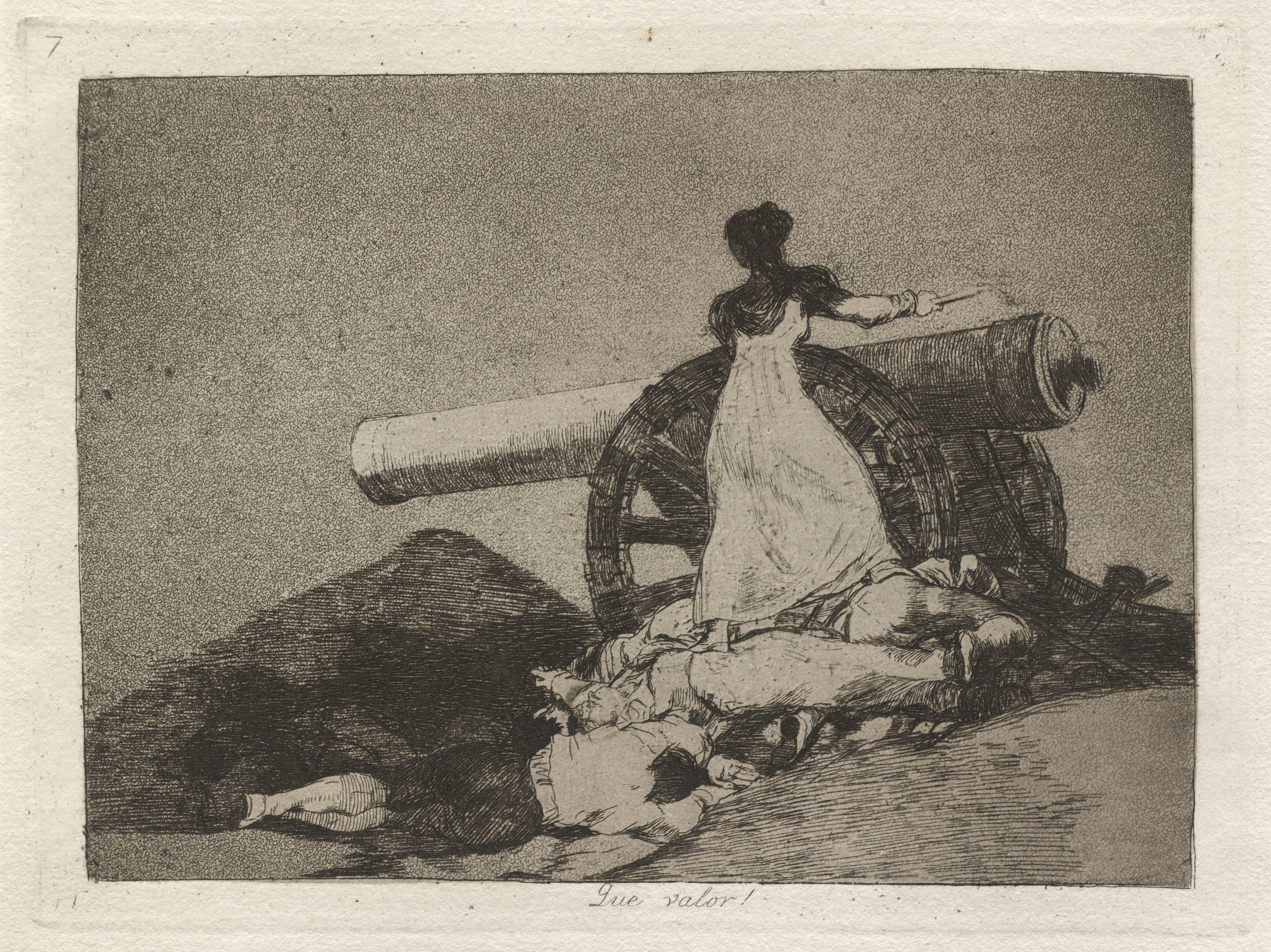
Plate 7– Que valor!

The Disasters of War plates are preoccupied with wasted bodies, undifferentiated body parts, castration and female abjection. There are dark erotic undertones to a number of the works. Connell notes the innate sexuality of the image in plate 7—Agustina de Aragón's igniting a long cannon. The art historian Lennard Davis suggests that Goya was fascinated with the "erotics of dismemberment", while Hughes mentions plate 10 in Los disparates, which shows a woman carried in the grip of a horse's mouth. To Hughes, the woman's euphoria suggests, among other possible meanings, orgasm.

Contrary to the idea of an erotic charge, the art historian, John J. Ciofalo, writes, that the artist's illness in 1793 and the deafness that resulted dramatically changed his art thereafter. But the 1808-14 "Spanish War for Independence"--"a violent convulsion of anarchy, starvation, and slaughter--injected his art with a new psychological sensibility, one that probed deep into the foundations of culture and the human psyche, into the lightless cracks and fissures created when these foundations are shattered by war," by guerrilla warfare. Goya sought to depict this modern mode of warfare, breaking down, by any means necessary, of the enemy's morale, and this includes disturbing images of rape against the walls of ruined buildings and in broad daylight. Far from being erotically charged, they are manifestly violent and abhorrent.

== Legacy ==
Despite being one of the most significant anti-war works of art, The Disasters of War had no impact on the European consciousness for two generations, as it was not seen outside a small circle in Spain until it was published by Madrid's Royal Academy of San Fernando in 1863.

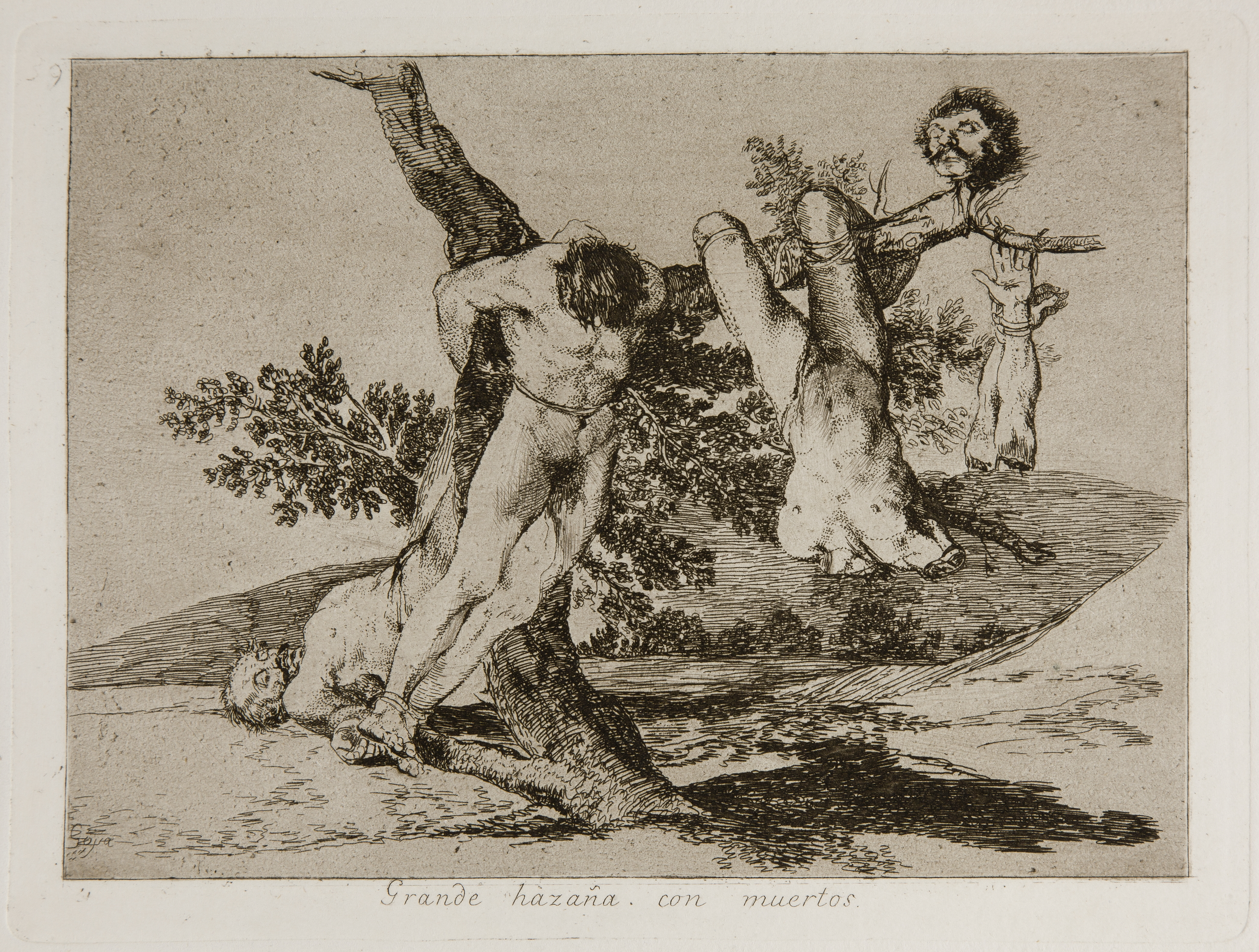
Plate 39: Grande hazaña! Con muertos! (A heroic feat! With dead men!).

Jake and Dinos Chapman, Great Deeds against the Dead, 1994, after Goya's etching

Since then, interpretations in successive eras have reflected the sensibilities of the time. Goya was seen as a proto-Romantic in the early 19th century, and the series' graphically rendered dismembered carcasses were a direct influence on Théodore Géricault, best known for the politically charged Raft of the Medusa (1818–19). Luis Buñuel identified with Goya's sense of the absurd, and referenced his works in such films as the 1930 L'Âge d'Or, on which he collaborated with Salvador Dalí, and his 1962 The Exterminating Angel.

The series' impact on Dalí is evident in Soft Construction with Boiled Beans (Premonition of Civil War), painted in 1936 in response to events leading to the Spanish Civil War. Here, the distorted limbs, brutal suppression, agonised expressions and ominous clouds are reminiscent of plate 39, Grande hazaña! Con muertos! (A heroic feat! With dead men!), in which mutilated bodies are shown against a backdrop barren landscape.

Goya's works were introduced into China shortly before the Second Sino-Japanese War. The Disasters of War was influential in China, particularly for its portrayal of defiance to invasion.

In 1993, Jake and Dinos Chapman of the Young British Artists movement created 82 miniature, toy-like sculptures modelled on The Disasters of War. The works were widely acclaimed and purchased that year by the Tate gallery. For decades, Goya's series of etching served as a constant point of reference for the Chapman brothers; in particular, they created a number of variations based on the plate Grande hazaña! Con muertos!. In 2003, the Chapman brothers exhibited an altered version of The Disasters of War. They purchased a complete set of prints, (Note: An edition that had been published in 1937, as a protest against fascist atrocities in the Spanish Civil War.) over which they drew and pasted demonic clown and puppy heads.

== Gallery ==
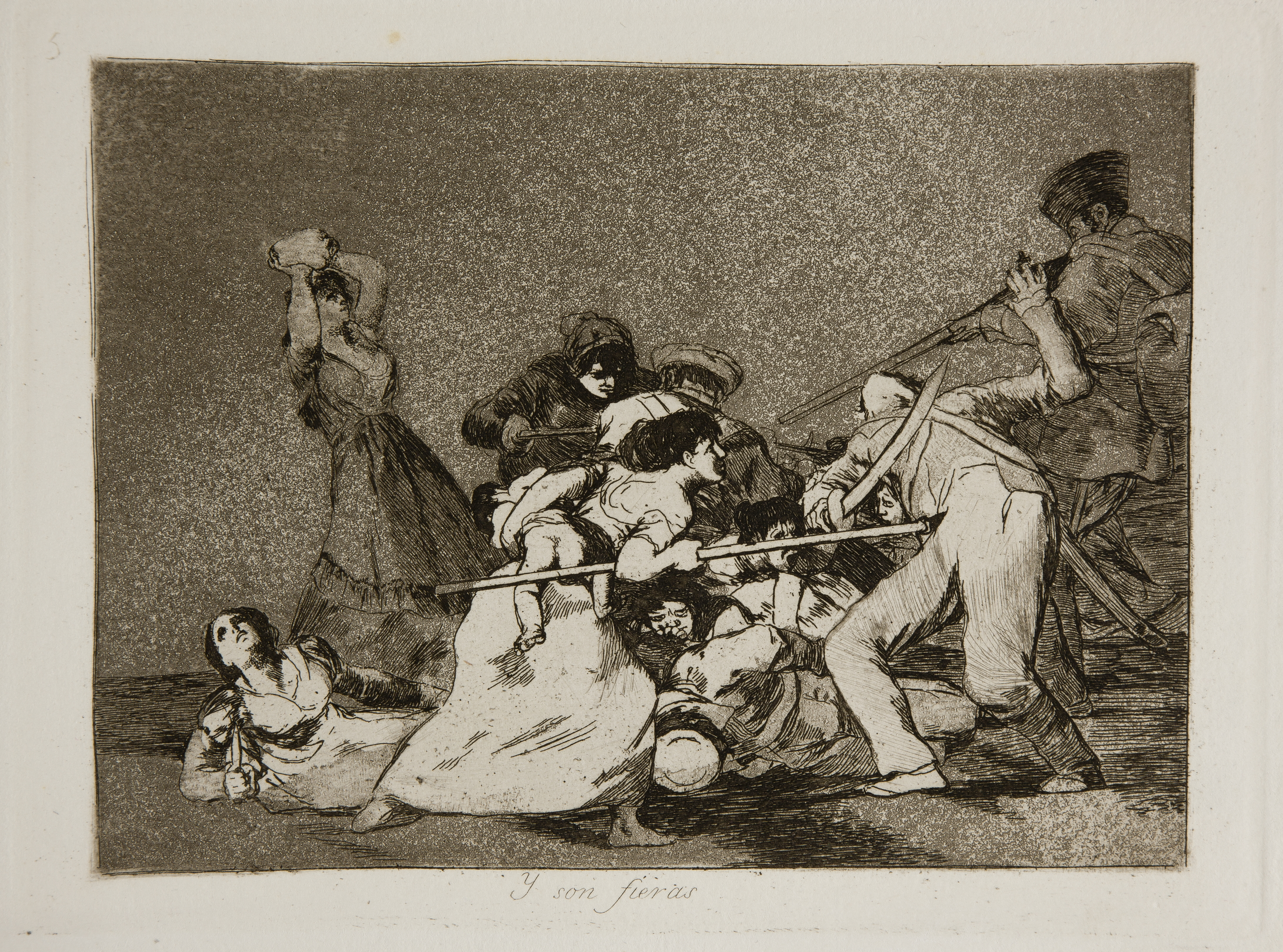
Plate 5: Y son fieras (And they are fierce or And they fight like wild beasts). Civilians, including women, fight against soldiers with spears and rocks.

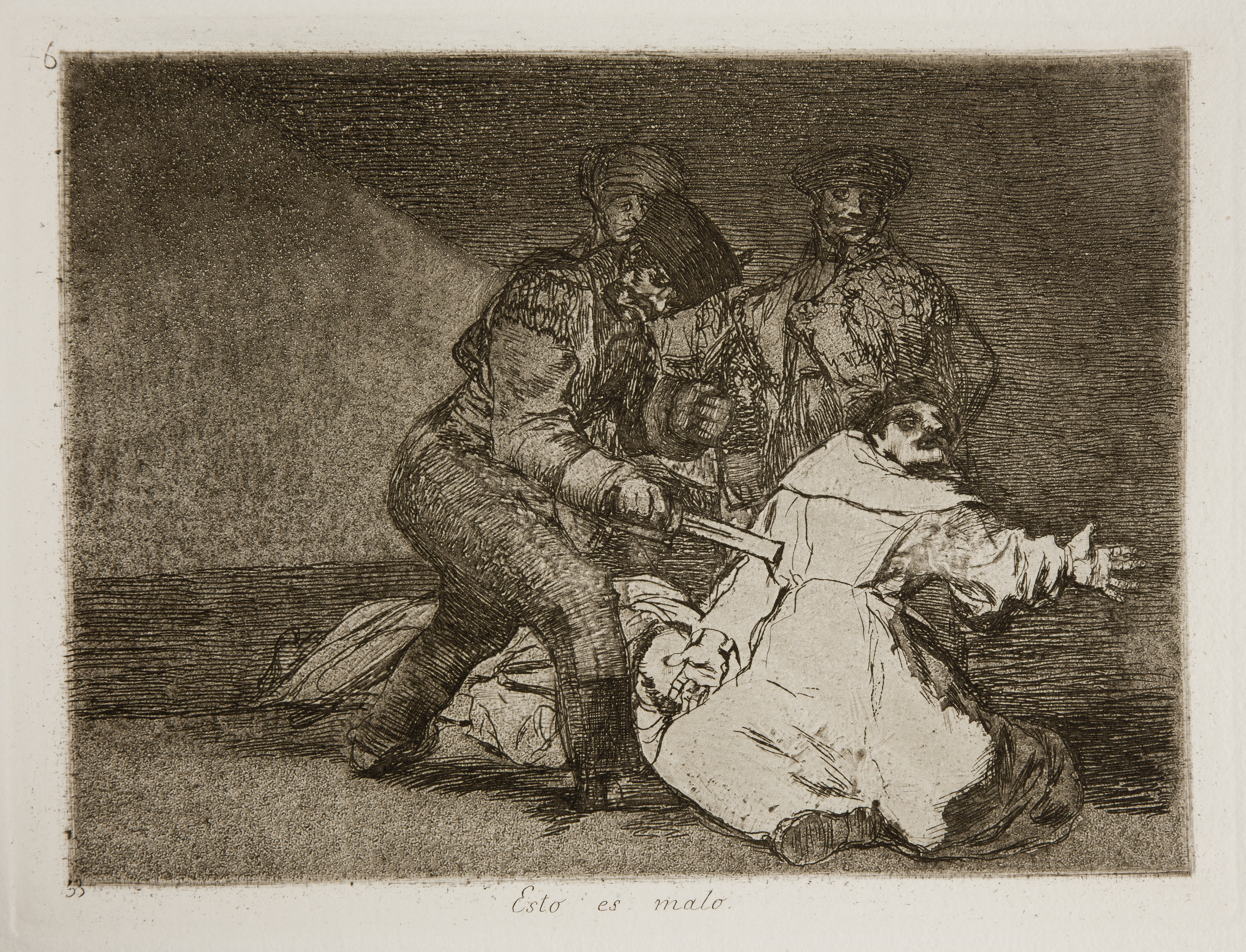
Plate 46: Esto es malo (This is bad). A monk is killed by French soldiers looting church treasures. A rare sympathetic image of clergy generally shown on the side of oppression and injustice.

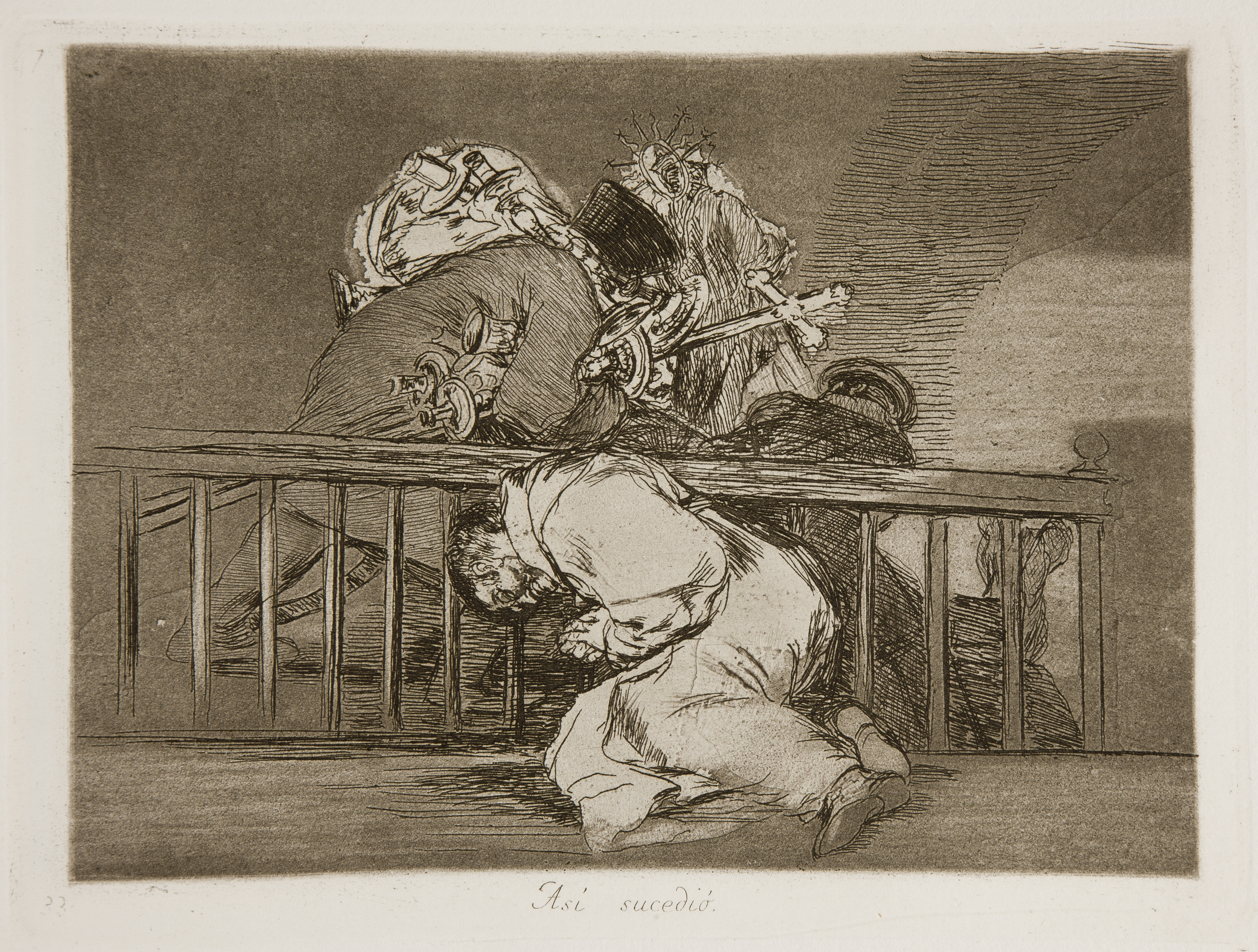
Plate 47: Así sucedió (This is how it happened). The last print in the first group. Murdered monks lay by French soldiers looting church treasures.

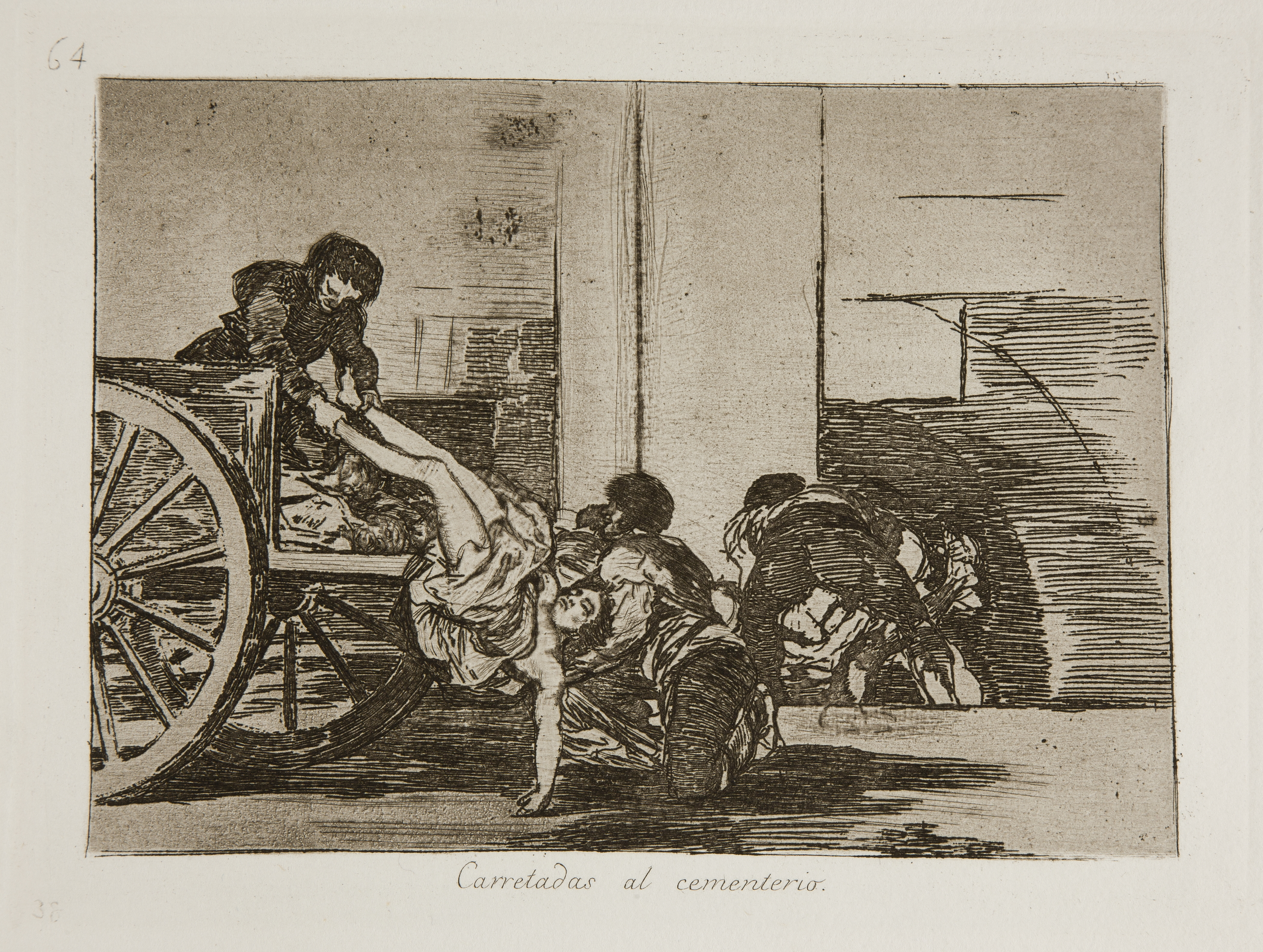
Plate 64: Carretadas al cementerio (Cartloads for the cemetery). The last print in the famine group.

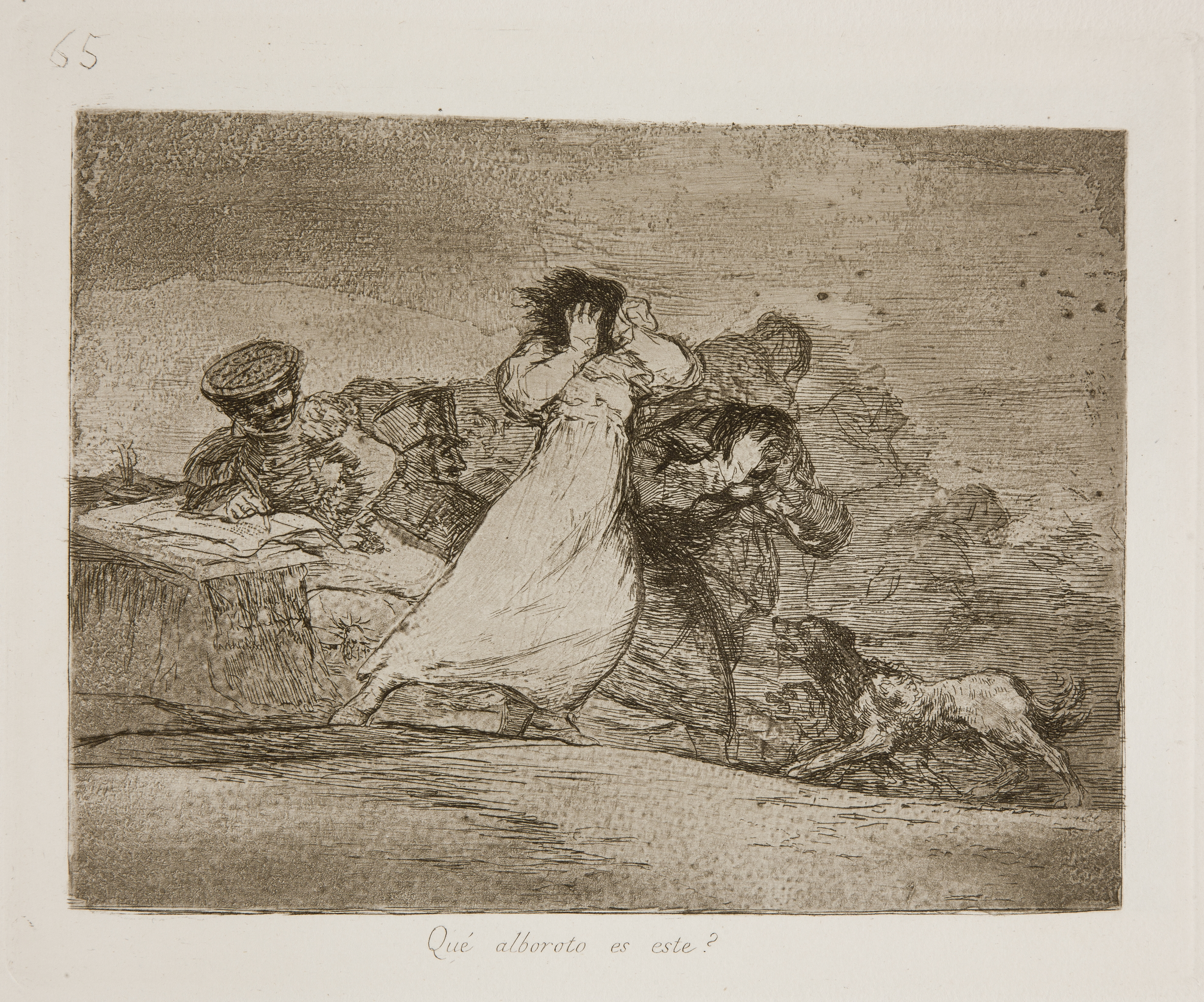
Plate 65: Qué alboroto es este? (What is this hubbub?). The first print in the final group. The woman likely represents the rejected Constitution of 1812.

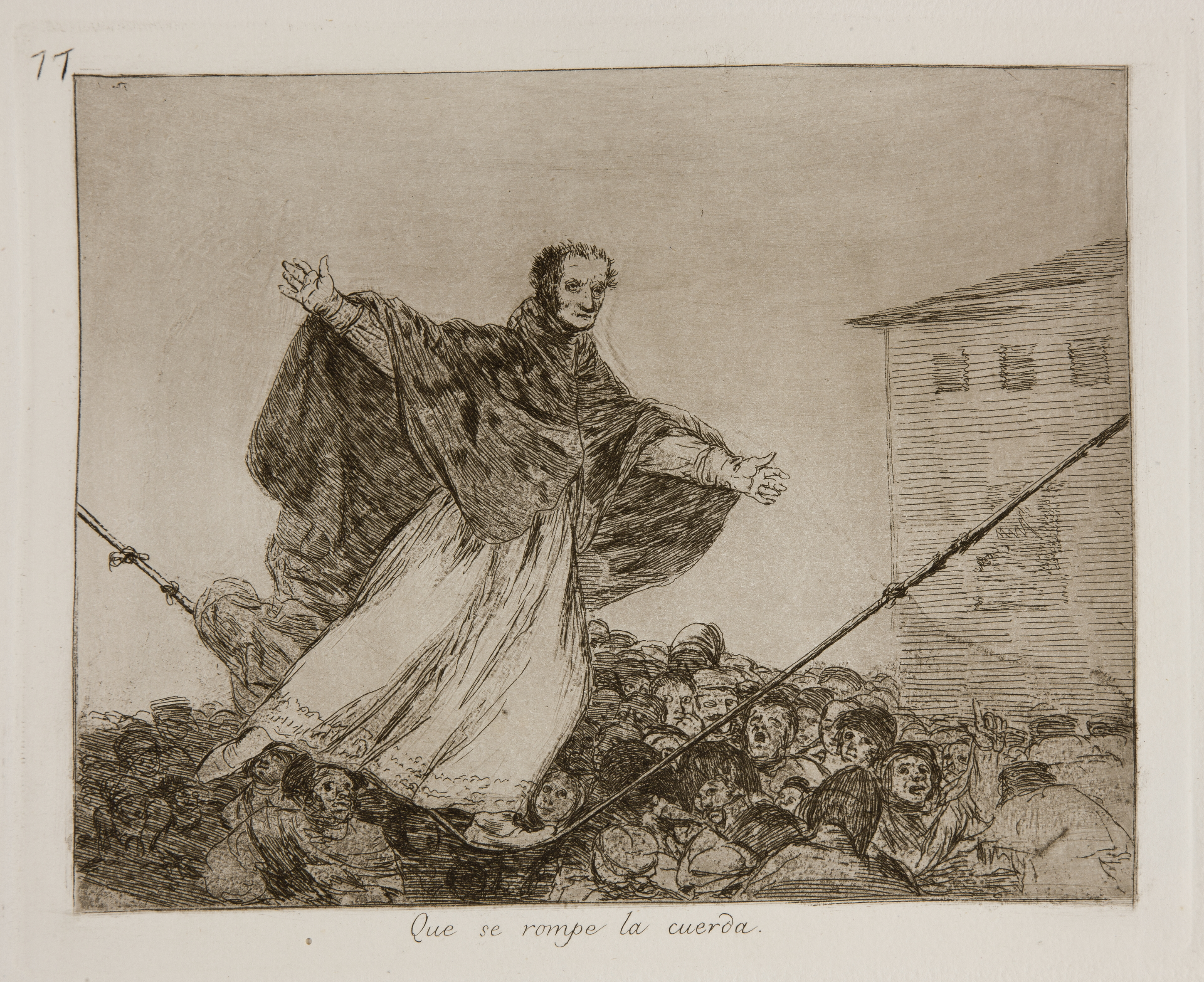
Plate 77: Que se rompe la cuerda! (The rope is breaking). In the preparatory drawing the cleric was a Pope.

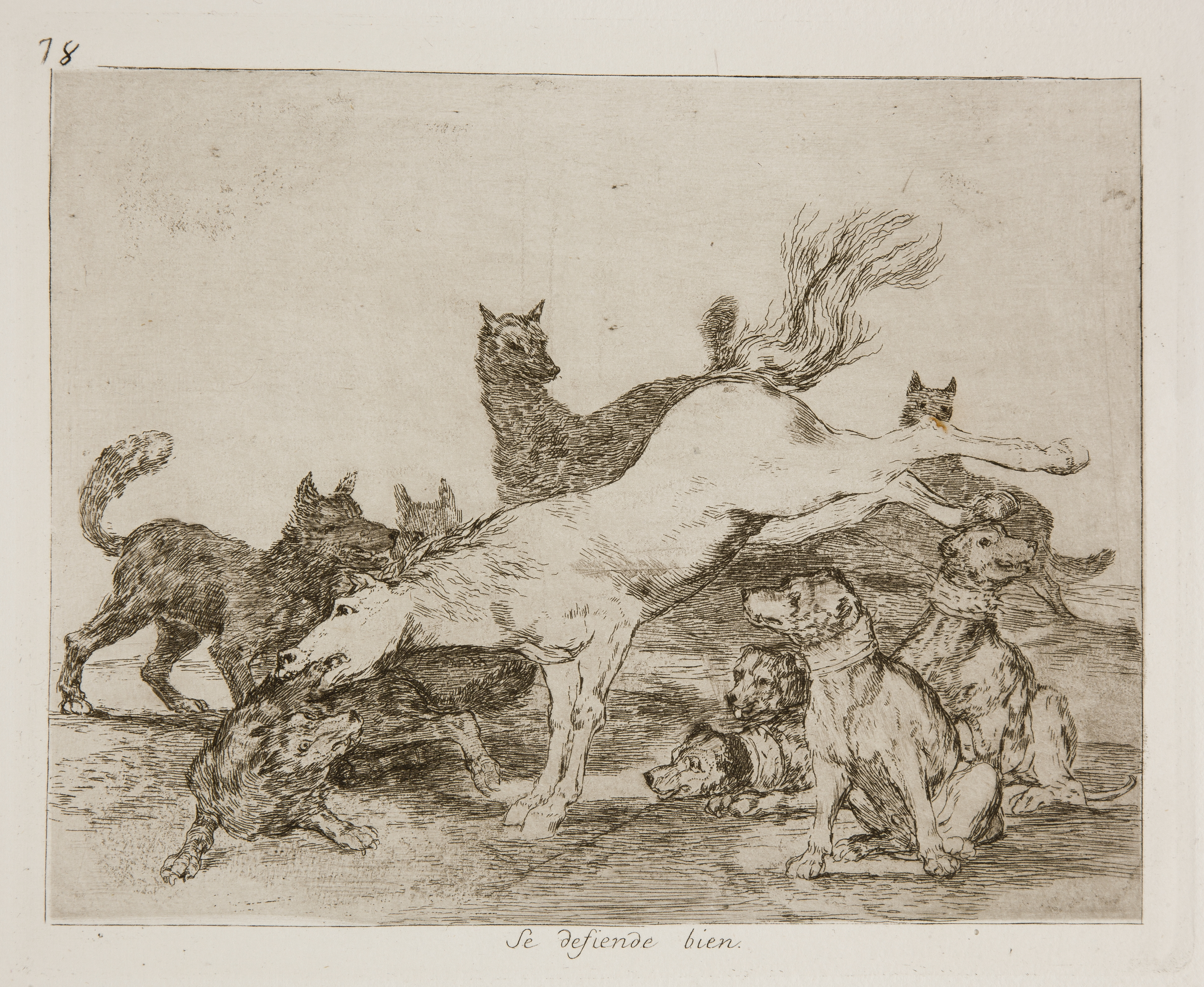
Plate 78: Se defiende bien (He defends himself well). The horse appears to be a metaphor for the constitutional monarchy, fighting without help from the wolf-hounds, who perhaps represent anti-monarchical revolution.

== Sources ==
- Clark, Kenneth. Looking at Pictures Archived 2017-09-13 at the Wayback Machine. Boston: Beacon Press, 1968.
- Connell, Evan S. Francisco Goya: A Life. New York: Counterpoint, 2004. ISBN 1-58243-307-0
- Cottom, Daniel. Unhuman Culture. University of Pennsylvania, 2006. ISBN 0-8122-3956-3
- Hollander, Anne. Moving Pictures. New York: Alfred A. Knopf, 1989. ISBN 0-394-57400-1
- Hughes, Robert. Goya. New York: Alfred A. Knopf, 2004. ISBN 0-394-58028-1
- Hughes, Robert. Nothing If Not Critical. London: The Harvill Press, 1990. ISBN 0-00-272075-2
- Huxley, Aldous. The Complete Etchings of Goya. New York: Crown Publishers, 1947.
- Licht, Fred. Goya: The Origins of the Modern Temper in Art. Universe Books, 1979. ISBN 0-87663-294-0
- McDonald, Mark. Disasters of War: Etchings by Francisco de Goya y Lucientes, from the unique album of proofs printed by the artist, in the collection of the British Museum . 2 volumes. London: Folio Society, 2014.
- Sayre, Eleanor A. The Changing Image: Prints by Francisco Goya. Boston: Museum of Fine Arts, 1974. ISBN 0-87846-085-3
- Shaw, Philip. "Abjection Sustained: Goya, the Chapman Brothers and the 'Disasters of War'". Art History 26, no. 4 (September 2003).
- Stoichita, Victor and Coderch, Anna Maria. Goya: the Last Carnival. London: Reaktion books, 1999. ISBN 1-86189-045-1
- Tomlinson, Janis. Graphic Evolutions: Prints by Goya from the Collection of the Arthur Ross Foundation. Exh. cat. Columbia Studies on Art, 2. New York: Columbia University Press, 1989. ISBN 0-231-06864-6
- Wilson-Bareau, Juliet. Goya's Prints, The Tomás Harris Collection in the British Museum. London: British Museum Publications, 1981. ISBN 0-7141-0789-1
