= Casta Álvarez =

Spanish military personnel (1786–1846)

Casta Álvarez Barceló
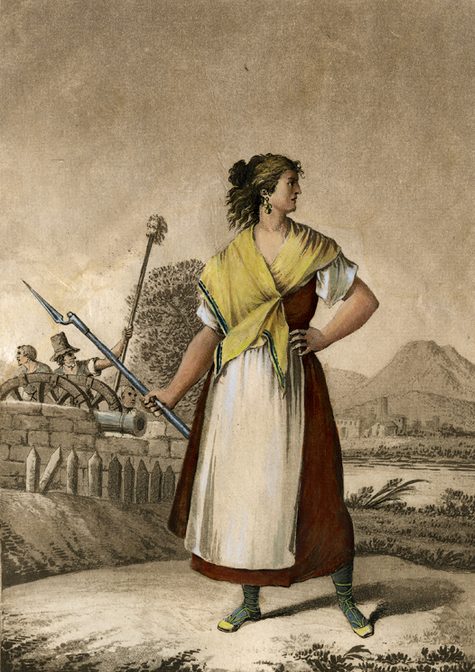
- Engraving by Juan Gálvez and Fernando Brambila (1808)
- Born: Casta Álvarez Barceló; 1786; Zaragoza, Spain or Orán, Algeria
- Died: 29 April 1846 Cabañas de Ebro, Zaragoza, Spain
- Allegiance: Spain
- Conflicts: Peninsular War
- Awards: Escudo de Distinción, Escudo de defensor de la Patria .

Casta Álvarez Barceló (1786 – 29 April 1846) was an Aragonese insurgent, who fought in the First siege of Zaragoza. This took place during the 1808 to 1814 Spanish War of Independence, or Guerra de la Independencia Española, part of the Peninsular War. She is known for inspiring the defenders of the city by single-handedly defeating an advancing French cavalry troop. Her story was popularised in a series of engravings entitled Ruinas de Zaragoza (Ruins of Zaragoza) published in 1812 and 1813. For her actions, she received a pension from Ferdinand VII of Spain and, at the centenary of the siege, her body was reinterred with honour.

== Biography ==
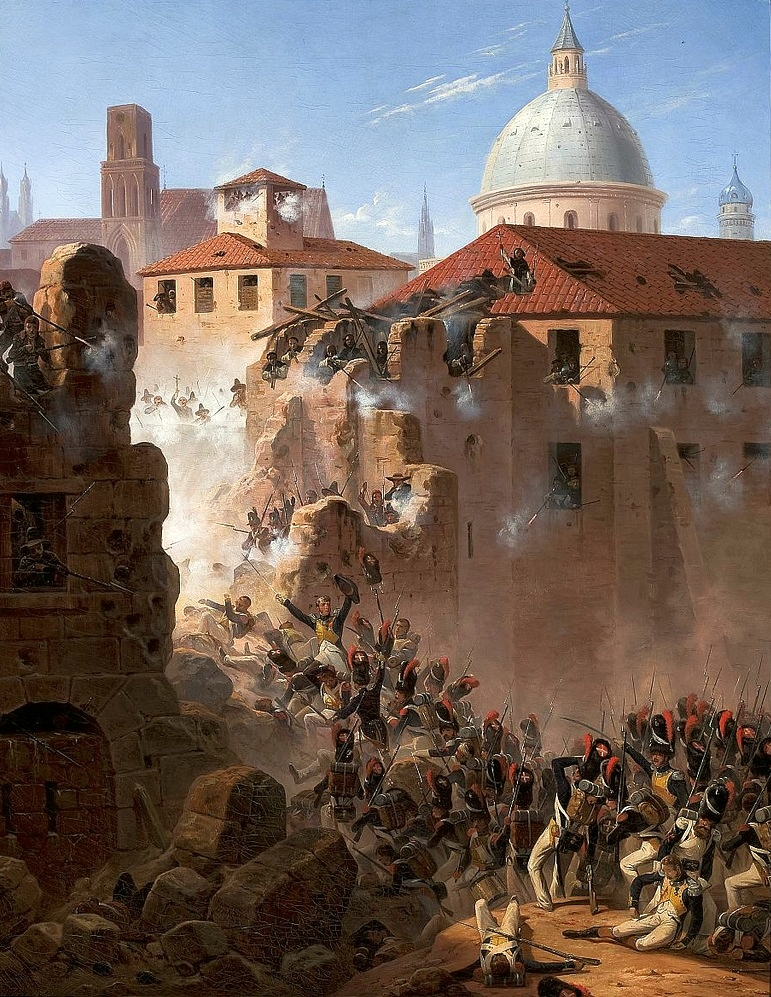
Assault on Saragossa by January Suchodolski

Álvarez Barceló was born of humble origins in 1786, the daughter of Manuela Barlo and Manuela Barlo, both natives of Figueruelas. She may have been a native of Zaragoza, or born in Orán in Algeria and moved to the city later in life. (Note: For example, the Historia de Aragón states she was born in Orán but the Gran Enciclopedia Aragonesa gives her birthplace as Zaragoza.) However, by 1808 she was a resident of the city. Following the Dos de Mayo Uprising in Madrid, French and Polish forces under Charles Lefebvre-Desnouettes were sent by Napoleon to put down the insurrection. On 15 June 1808, Lefebvre-Desnouettes arrived at Zaragoza ready to attack the city.

The attack on the city was particularly brutal, being a combination of hand to hand combat on the streets and a siege to starve the citizens, which led to a huge human toll from disease as well as the conflict itself. The defenders, led by José de Palafox y Melci, were ill-trained compared to the French and Polish troops and fought a desperate fight. Álvarez Barceló helped organise supplies and munitions for the citizens and defenders.

In addition to this crucial work, while operating near the Puerta del Carmen, she found herself in grave danger. Suddenly surrounded by French cavalry, rather than fleeing, she picked up a discarded musket and started firing. The French, surprised by the fierceness of this Spanish peasant and her skill with the weapon, retreated. Her actions inspired the defending troops and the French forces were repulsed. She subsequently also participated in the second siege of Zaragoza and once again her personality, as well as her military prowess, inspired the people of Zaragoza, who considered her a hero. (Note: According to Historia de Aragón, the people were inspired by her use of the bayonet as a sword.)

Once the city was occupied by the French forces, she moved with her parents to Cabañas de Ebro. After the conflict, she married a wealthy farmer in 1814 and lived the rest of her life in obscurity, dying a widow at the age of 60 on 29 April 1846. In recognition of her action, Álvarez Barceló was awarded the Escudo de Distinción (Shield of Distinction) and Escudo de Defensor de la Patria (Shield of a Defender of the Fatherland), along with a pension from Ferdinand VII of Spain conferred on 30 May 1815.

== Legacy ==
Despite the fact that the Spanish were ultimately defeated at Zaragoza, Álvarez Barceló, along with other heroines of the conflict like Agustina de Aragón, became an important national icon. The inspiration from these female fighters is visible in Francisco Goya's work The Disasters of War. Her story was told in the reports of the day which spread across the continent of Europe, particularly inspiring contemporary British readers. Her image was popularised in the series of engravings by Juan Gálvez and Fernando Brambila entitled Ruinas de Zaragoza (Ruins of Zaragoza) published in Cádiz in 1812 and 1813. A portrait by Marcelino de Unceta from 1875 was also displayed in Zaragoza. In 1908, at the centennial of the siege, her body was re-interred in honour in the Chapel of the Anunciación del Santuario de Nuestra Señora del Portillo and a road was named after her.

== See also ==
- Giuseppa Bolognara Calcagno
- Juana Galán
- María Mayor Fernández de Cámara y Pita

== Sources ==
- Blanco Lalinde, Leonardo (2005). "Casta Álvarez, la heroína de Cabañas de Ebro". Sitios de Zaragoza (in Spanish) (6): 10–12.
- Castells, Irene; Espigado Tocino, Gloria; Romeo Mateo, María Cruz; Acosta Ramírez, Francisco (2009). Heroínas y Patriotas : Mujeres de 1808 (in Spanish). Madrid: Catedra Ediciones. ISBN 978-8-4376-2575-1.
- Esdaile, Charles J. (2014). Women in the Peninsular War. Norman: University of Oklahoma Press. ISBN 978-0-8061-4478-8.
- Haythornthwaite, Philip J. (2003). The Peninsula War. London: Brassey’s. ISBN 978-1-8575-3329-3.
- Pasqual de Quinto y de los Ríos, José (1986). Los Sitios de Zaragoza, 1808-1809 (in Spanish). Zaragoza: Caja de Ahorros de la Inmaculada de Aragón, Confederación Española de Cajas de Ahorros. ISBN 978-8-45054-292-9.
- Saglia, Diego (2000). Poetic Castles in Spain: British Romanticism and Figurations of Iberia. Amsterdam: Rodopi. ISBN 978-9-04200-428-3.
- Tone, John Lawrence (1999). "Spanish Women in the Resistance to Napoleon, 1808-1814". In Enders, Victoria Lorée; Radcliff, Pamela Beth (eds.). Constructing Spanish Womanhood: Female Identity in Modern Spain. Albany: State University of New York Press. pp. 259–282. ISBN 978-0-7914-4029-2.
- Vega, Jesusa; Molina Martín, Alvaro (2008). "Imágenes de la alteridad: el "pueblo" de Goya y su construcción histórica". In Álvarez Barrientos, Joaquín (ed.). La Guerra de la Independencia en la cultura española (in Spanish). Madrid: Siglo XXI de España. pp. 131–158. ISBN 978-84-323-1329-5.
