= Agustina de Aragón =

Spanish Heroine

- Born: Agustina Raimunda María Saragossa y Domènech; 4 March 1786; Barcelona, Spain
- Died: 29 May 1857 (aged 71); Ceuta, Spain
- Burial place: Nuestra Señora del Portillo
- Military career
- Allegiance: Kingdom of Spain; Cortes of Cádiz
- Branch: Spanish Army
- Rank: Captain
- Conflicts: Peninsular War: First Siege of Zaragoza; Second Siege of Zaragoza; Battle of Vitoria
- Awards: Defensora de Zaragoza; Recompensa del valor y patriotismo

Agustina Raimunda María Saragossa i Domènech (March 4, 1786 – May 29, 1857), better known as Agustina of Aragón, was a Spanish woman who defended Spain during the Peninsular War, first as a civilian and later as a professional officer in the Spanish Army. Known as "the Spanish Joan of Arc," she has been the subject of much folklore, mythology, and artwork, including sketches by Francisco Goya and the poetry of Lord Byron.

== Siege of Zaragoza ==
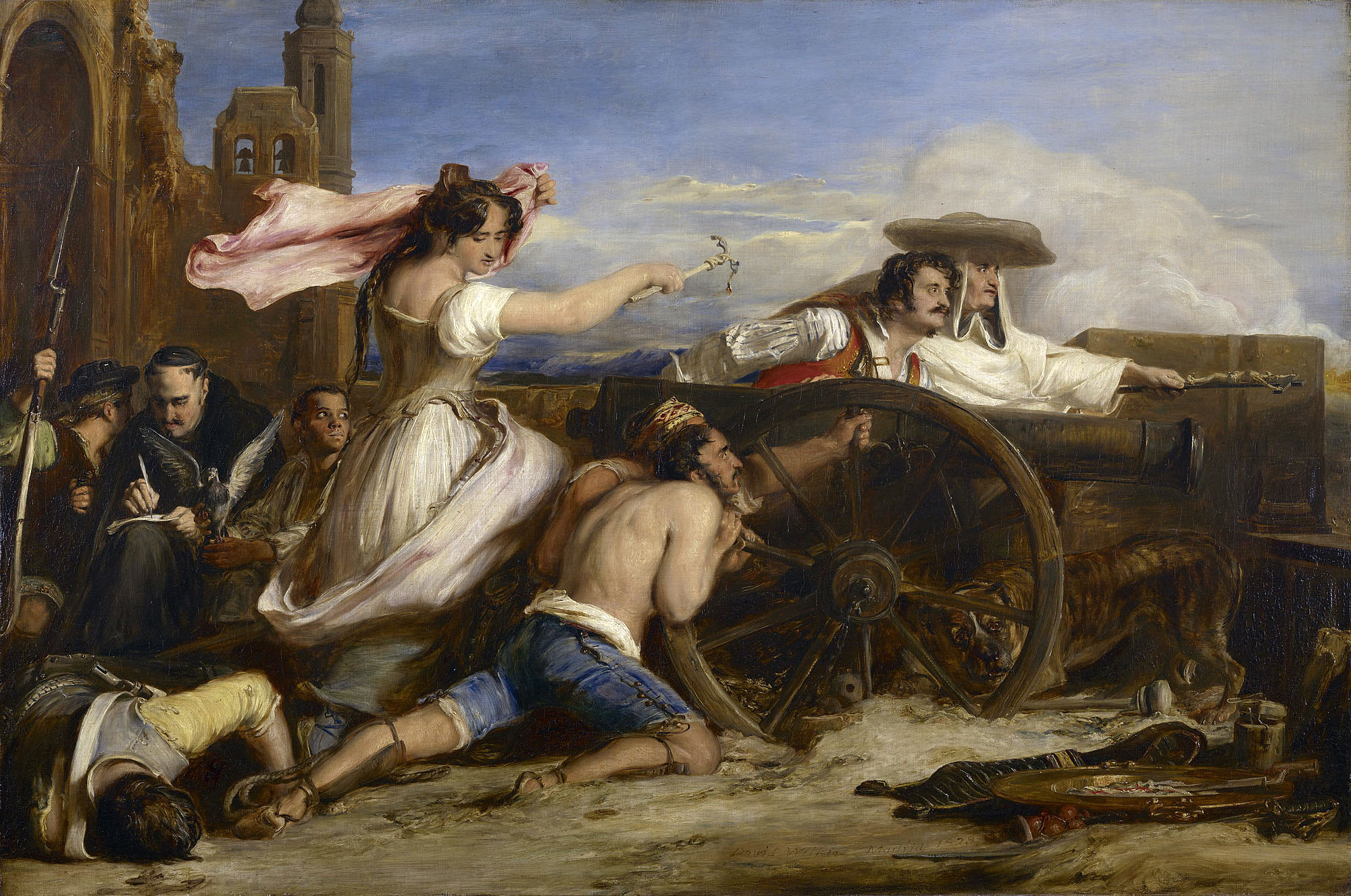
The Defence of Saragossa by David Wilkie

In the summer of 1808, Zaragoza was one of the last cities in northern Spain not to have fallen to the forces of Napoleon and was therefore, by the time of the First Siege of Zaragoza (1808), choked with vast numbers of refugees fleeing the advancing Grande Armée. In early June, the French began to advance on Zaragoza, which had not seen war for about 450 years and was held by a tiny provincial force under José de Palafox y Melci, whose heroism would come to rival Agustina's.

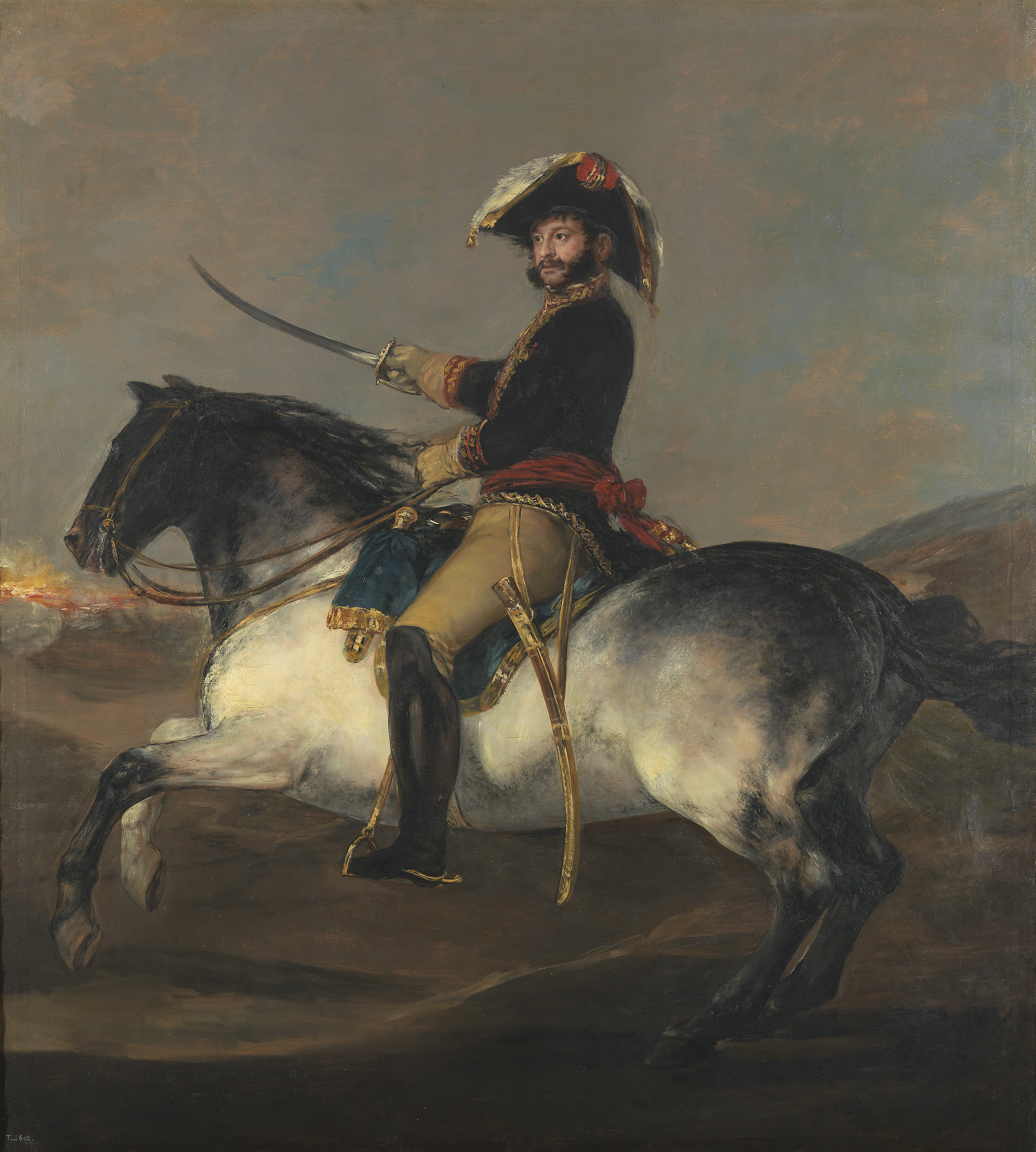
General José de Palafox on Horseback by Francisco Goya

On June 15, 1808, the French army stormed the Portillo, an ancient gateway into the city defended by a hodgepodge battery of old cannons and a heavily outnumbered volunteer unit. Agustina, arriving on the ramparts with a basket of apples to feed the gunners, watched the nearby defenders fall to French bayonets. The Spanish troops broke ranks, having suffered heavy casualties, and abandoned their posts. With the French troops a few yards away, Agustina herself ran forward, loaded a cannon, and lit the fuse, shredding a wave of attackers at point-blank range.

The sight of a lone woman bravely manning the cannons inspired the fleeing Spanish troops and other volunteers to return and assist her. After a bloody struggle, the French gave up the assault on Zaragoza and abandoned their siege for a few short weeks before returning to fight their way into the city, house-by-house. With the human cost proving truly terrible on both sides and the city's defences hopelessly compromised, Palafox finally accepted the inevitable and was forced to surrender the city to the French. Despite the eventual defeat, Agustina's action became an inspiration to those opposing the French.

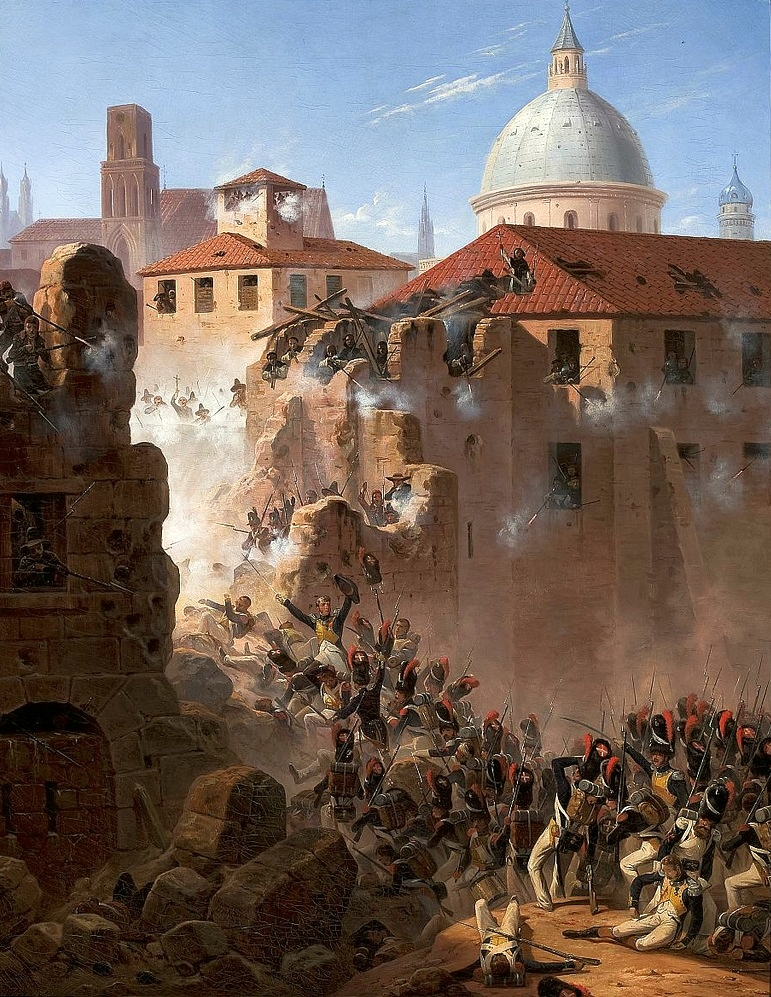
Assault on Saragossa by January Suchodolski, 1845

Original records on Agustina suggest that she was not fervently patriotic or pious, but an ordinary girl motivated by war. In the mores of the time, a woman who took on "manly" duties posed a problem. However, as the French-imprisoned King of Spain was considered anointed of God, the Church declared it the duty of every Spaniard to take up arms against his captors.

Various places claim to be Agustina's birthplace. Most biographies suggest that she was born in Reus, in Tarragona, in 1786. At an early age, her family moved to Madrid. She showed an independence of mind from an early age and records indicate that she was a persistent nuisance, hanging around the Army barracks at the age of 13.

Although popular history records that she married for love at the age of 16, the age of her son at his death is disputed, suggesting that she might already have been pregnant at the time of her marriage to an artillery gunner by the name of Joan Roca Vila-Seca. The name of her firstborn child does not appear in the popular record, though a gravestone indicates his name was Eugenio. Although her husband was in the army as the Peninsular War was breaking out, she abruptly left him to return to the home of her sister in Zaragoza.

=== A leader in the resistance ===
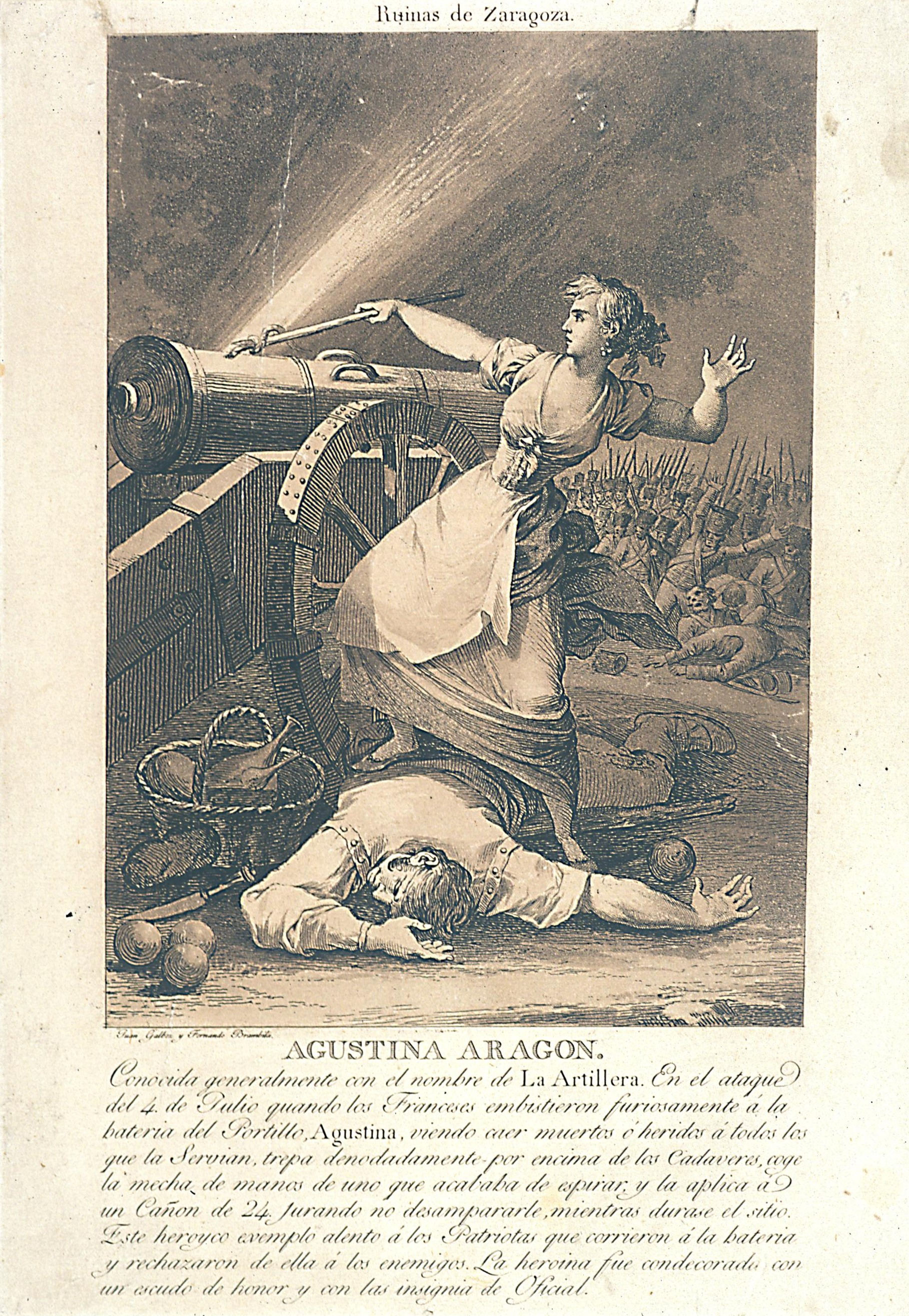
Contemporary illustration of Agustina in a Spanish wartime paper, by Juan Gálvez and Fernando Brambila, c. 1812–1813

The image of Agustina as the saviour of Zaragoza has, however, also overshadowed her later actions. After being captured, she was imprisoned and saw Eugenio die at the hands of her French guards. She subsequently mounted a daring escape and became a low-level rebel leader for the guerrilleros, helping to organise raids and attacks that harassed the French. As the strategic situation deteriorated for the French Army, her role became increasingly orthodox as supplies and training were covertly provided by the Duke of Wellington.

=== Battle of Vitoria ===
According to popular Spanish legend, Agustina began to fight for the allied forces as Wellington's only female "officer" and ultimately rose to the rank of captain. According to the legend, on June 21, 1813, she acted as a front line battery commander at the Battle of Vitoria under the command of a Major "Cairncross", who reported directly to Wellington himself. Historian Nick Lipscombe, author of Wellington's Guns: The Untold Story of Wellington and his Artillery in the Peninsula and at Waterloo, refutes these legends in his book. The Battle of Vitoria was to see the French Army that had occupied Spain effectively smashed beyond repair and driven out of Spain.

=== Later life and death ===
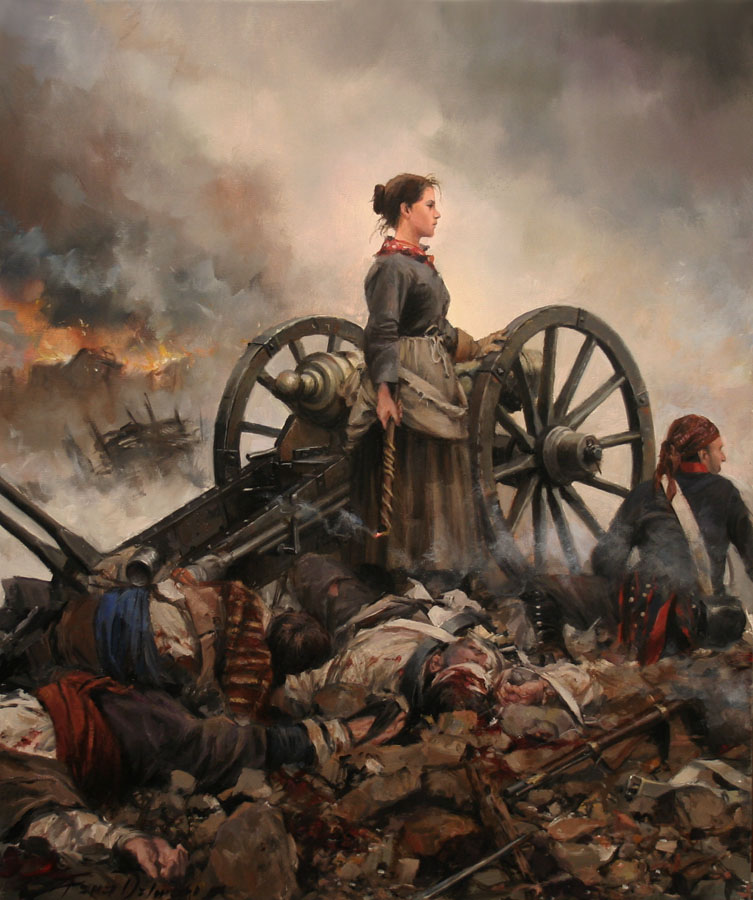
Agustina de Aragón (2012) by Augusto Ferrer-Dalmau

After the war, she married a doctor and, late in life, she became a familiar sight in Zaragoza as a respectable old lady, wearing medals, who used to go for walks around the Portillo. Agustina de Aragón died at the age of 71 in Ceuta. She was buried in an unmarked grave. In 1870 her remains were moved to the Church of Our Lady of the Pillar, and on 14 June 1908 moved again, to the Chapel of the Annunciation in the Church of Our Lady (Nuestra Señora del Portillo).

== Popular culture ==
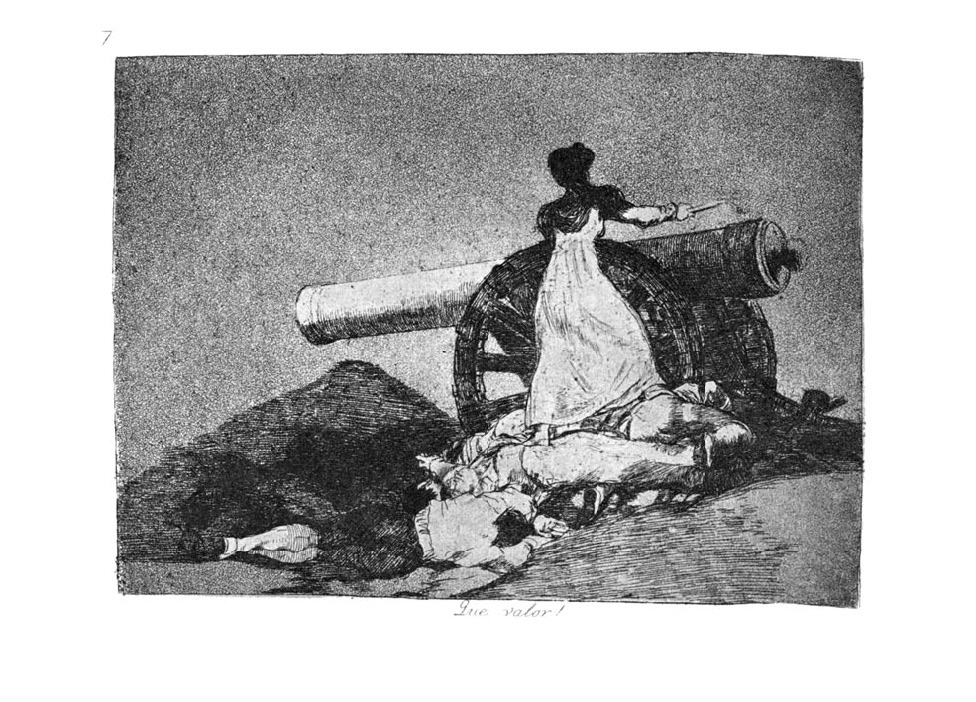
¡Que valor! a plate in Francisco Goya's series The Disasters of War

Agustina is the only clearly recognisable figure in The Disasters of War by Goya, who was from the same city.

Lord Byron wrote several highly detailed verses in Childe Harold about Agustina. Byron is known to have traveled throughout Europe, often turning up in places shortly before the arrival of British troops. Despite being considered by most critics as wrong on the grounds that she was already married, Childe Harold clearly states that a key reason for running to defend the city by manning the cannons was that Agustina had an illicit lover in the city by the name of Raul and that it was seeing close at hand his mortal wounding in the front line that drove her actions. Despite having supposedly never met Agustina before writing Childe Harold, records show that the two of them did indeed meet afterwards.

Agustina's life was portrayed in the 1929 silent film Agustina of Aragon. She was played by Aurora Bautista in the 1950 CIFESA film Agustina of Aragon.

== See also ==
- Casta Álvarez
- Juana Galán
- Maria Pita
- Deborah Sampson
- Manuela Sancho
- Molly Pitcher
- Pancha Carrasco
- Anna Maria Lane
- Giuseppa Bolognara Calcagno
