= Manuela Sancho =

Aragonese revolutionary (1784–1863)

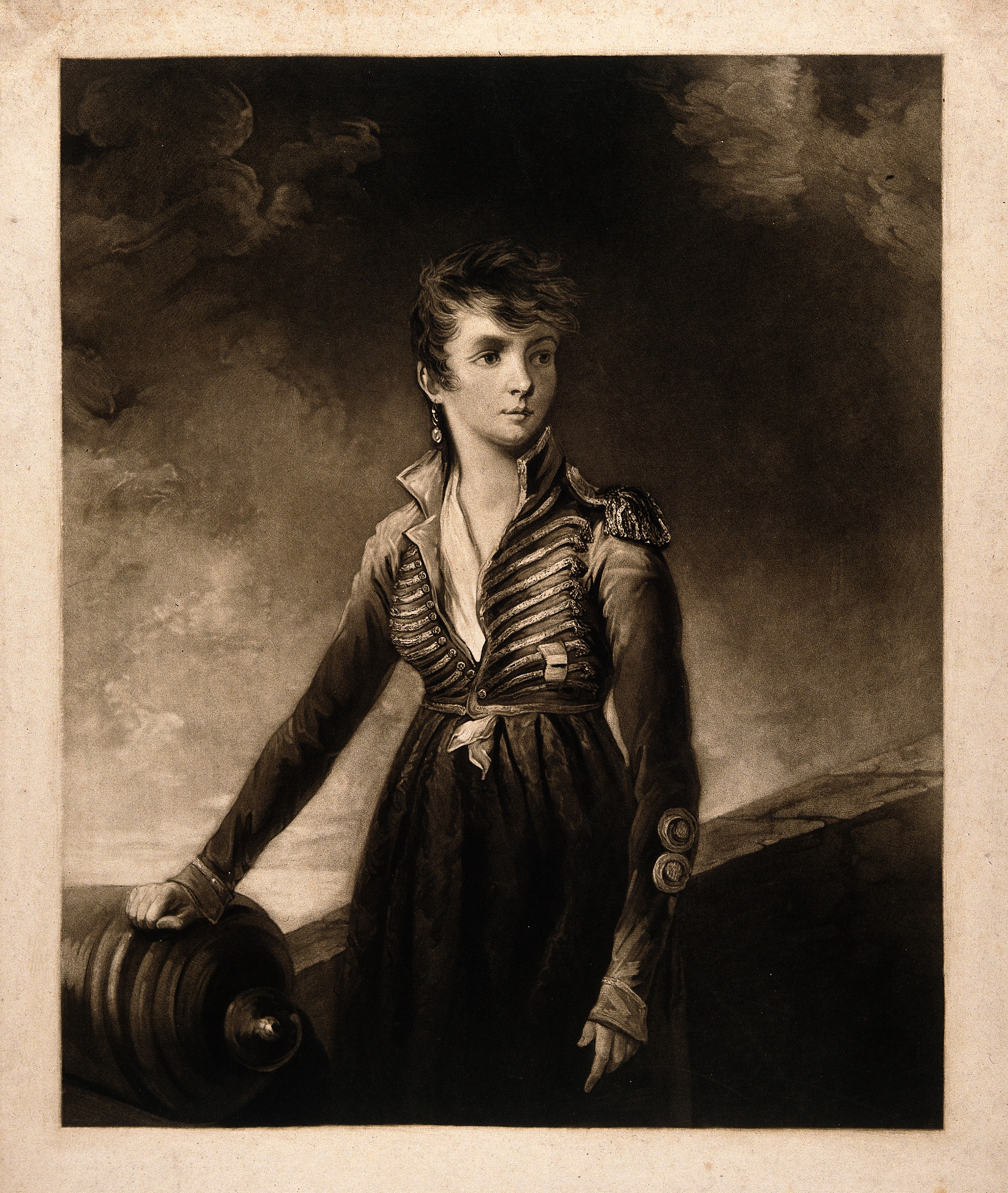
- Born: Manuela Sancho y Bonafonte; 16 June 1784; Plenas, Province of Zaragoza, Aragon, Spain
- Died: 7 April 1863 (aged 78); Zaragoza, Aragon, Spain
- Cause of death: Pneumonia
- Burial place: Church of Nuestra Señora del Portillo
- Military career
- Allegiance: Kingdom of Spain
- Service: Spanish Army
- Conflicts: Peninsular War: First Siege of Zaragoza; Second Siege of Zaragoza

Manuela Sancho y Bonafonte (1784–1863) was an Aragonese revolutionary who participated in the defense of Zaragoza during the Peninsula War.

== Biography ==
=== Early life ===
Manuela Sancho y Bonafonte was born in Plenas, a small town in the province of Zaragoza, on 16 June 1784. She was the first child of the smallholders Juan Antonio Sancho Artal and María Bonafonte Yus, and was baptised in the local church. When Sancho was 12 years old, her family moved to the Aragonese capital of Zaragoza. They settled on Calle Puerta Quemada, which is now known as Calle del Heroísmo.

=== Sieges of Zaragoza ===
In 1808, Zaragoza was besieged by the invading French Imperial Army. Sancho and other women, who were prevented from taking up arms because of their gender, were involved in distributing provisions to the city's defenders.

The siege ended in August and was at peace for the last months of the year. But on 21 December 1808, the city was besieged again. During the second siege, Sancho fought on the front lines against the French invaders, defending the Convent of San José. From 31 December to 2 January 1809, she fought in the trenches on Pabostre Street, where she was shot in the stomach.

After recovering from her wound, she was awarded by Mariano Renovales with a red ribbon for her conduct as an artillerywoman and riflewoman, which she wore for the rest of her life; she also received a military pension of 2 reales per day.

=== Later life ===
Manuela Sancho spent the rest of her life in Zaragoza. She was married three times: first to a farmer, Manuel Martínez; then to a military porter, Joaquín Tapieca, who died in 1849; finally she married a garrisonier, Santiago de San José, in 1853. She died from pneumonia on 7 April 1863, at her home on Calle de San Jerónimo. Her remains were buried in the Torrero cemetery, and on 15 June 1908, were reinterred at the Church of Nuestra Señora del Portillo, alongside the remains of Agustina de Aragón and Casta Álvarez. She was survived by her third husband.

== Legacy ==
Pabostre Street, where Sancho was shot, was renamed to "Calle de Maria Sancho" in her honour. She also received a plaque in Plaza del Portillo and a painting of her was hung in the Deputation of Zaragoza. In Plenas, her family house was restored and converted into a museum. Sancho was also featured as a character in Benito Pérez Galdós' historical novel Zaragoza, in which he described her as a "slender, intrepid, grandiose girl, the image of tragic serenity". Her biography was also collected in the Aragonese illustrated history book Zaurines, in which the author Ana Alcolea praised Sancho for not conforming to traditional gender roles.

== Bibliography ==
- Canales, Candela (30 April 2021). "Manuela Sancho, la heroína de la Guerra de la Independencia que luchó en Los Sitios de Zaragoza". El Diario (in Spanish).
- Fernández Poza, Milagros (2018). "Manuela Sancho y Bonafonte". Royal Academy of History (in Spanish).
