= Juan Gálvez (painter) =

Spanish painter

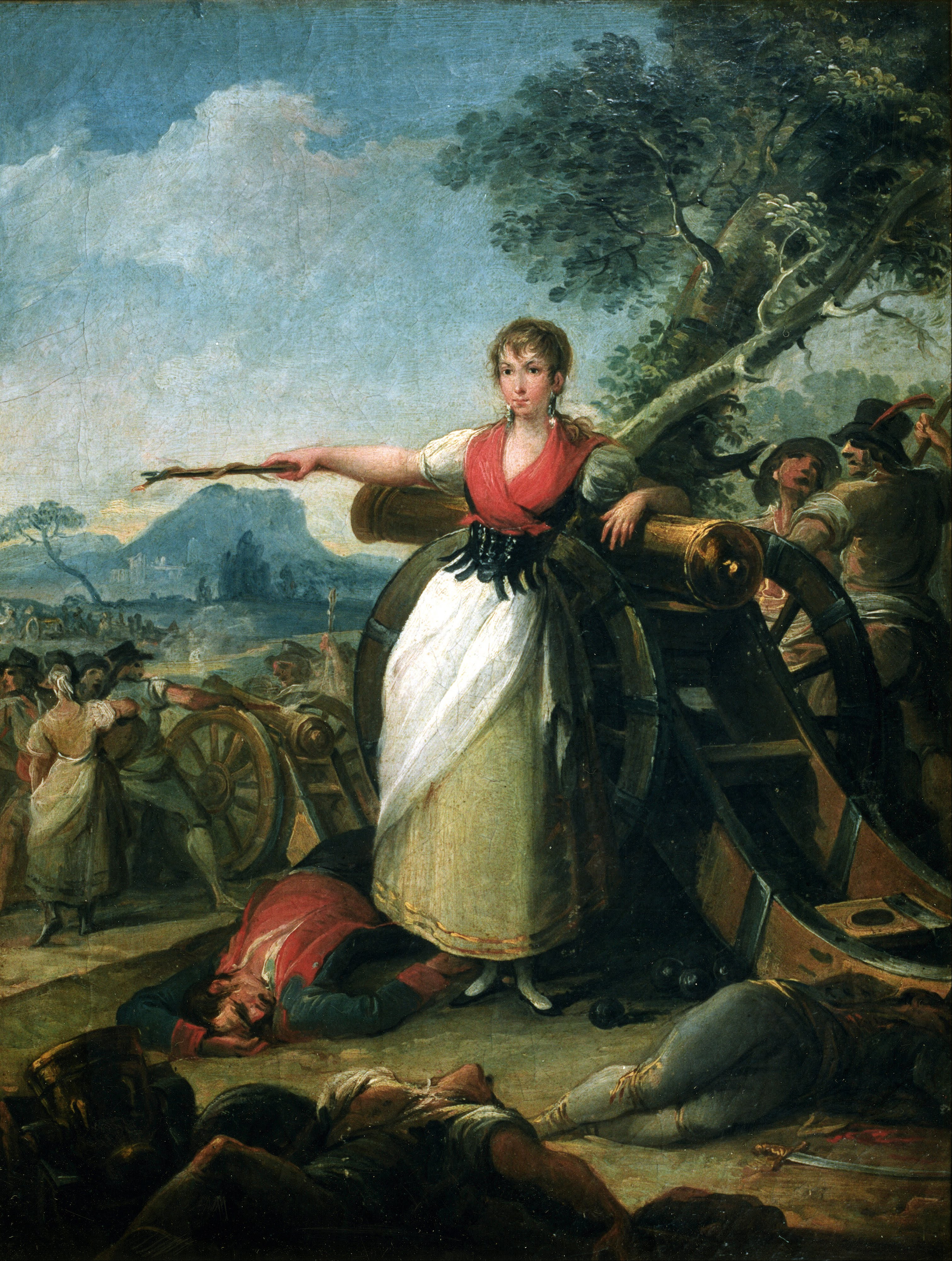
- Agustina de Aragón
- Born: 1774; Mora, Spain
- Died: 12 December 1846 (aged 71–72); Madrid, Spain
- Known for: court painter for King Ferdinand VII

Juan Gálvez (1774, Mora - 12 December 1846, Madrid) was a Spanish artist who served as court painter for King Ferdinand VII and Director of the Real Academia de Bellas Artes de San Fernando.

== Life and work ==
He began painting for the court of King Charles IV at the age of twenty; doing decorative work at the Casita del Príncipe and the Royal Palace of El Pardo. In 1801, he began working in Aranjuez, painting ceilings at the Royal Palace and the Casa del Labrador. Five years later, he was given an official position under the direction of Mariano Salvador Maella.

In the early stages of hostilities in the Peninsular War, he and Fernando Brambila were invited to Zaragoza by General José de Palafox to make sketches documenting the damage suffered during the First Siege, together with the most important military encounters. These were issued in a series of thirty-two plates called the Grabados de la Ruina de Zaragoza, which was published in Cádiz.

At the end of the war, he continued to work for the court. He painted a portrait of King Ferdinand VII and was named a member of the Real Academia de Bellas Artes de San Fernando. In 1816, upon the death of the Italian-born artist, Luis Japelli, he succeeded to the office of Court Painter. In 1829, he became Director of the Academia. During this period, he executed numerous commissions from the King for painted vaults and ceilings. He also created several murals for structures such as the Casino de la Reina in Madrid, and several rooms in El Escorial, including the Monastery, the Ambassador's Hall, the Throne Room and the Royal Retreat.

Ornamental designs also play a large role in his oeuvre; notably in the chapel at the Royal Palace and the chapel that his son, Miguel Gálvez (1804-?), designed for the Real quinta de Quitapesares.
