= The Maid of Saragossa =

Painting by Benjamin Robert Haydon

- Artist: Benjamin Robert Haydon
- Year: 1842
- Type: Oil on canvas, history painting
- Dimensions: 203.5 cm × 310 cm (80.1 in × 120 in)
- Location: The Box; Plymouth

The Maid of Saragossa is an oil on canvas history painting by the British artist Benjamin Robert Haydon, from 1842.

== History and description ==
It depicts the role played by Agustina de Aragón in repulsing a French attack on Zaragoza in 1808 during the Peninsular War. After her artilleryman lover had been killed she had taken over and fired a cannon at the French attackers. The image was a popular one with artists and Haydon's college David Wilkie had enjoyed success with The Defence of Saragossa in 1828.

Haydon had considered it as a possible subject for a painting as early as 1808. Begun in 1836, a number of delays including imprisonment for debt meant he did not begin on it in earnest until shortly after he had finished his epic The Black Prince Thanking Lord James Audley at Poitiers and wasn't completed until six years later. Haydon raffled the painting which raised £525, although his attempt to involve the Dowager Queen Adelaide in the process was unsuccessful. The painting was exhibited at the Royal Academy's Summer Exhibition of 1843 in Trafalgar Square. It was acquired by the Plymouth City Museum and Art Gallery in 1935.

== Bibliography ==
- Jolliffe, John (ed.) Neglected Genius: The Diaries of Benjamin Robert Haydon, 1808–1846. Faber & Faber, 2012.
- O'Keeffe, Paul. A Genius for Failure: The life of Benjamin Robert Haydon. Random House, 2011.
- Tromans, Nicholas. David Wilkie: The People's Painter. Edinburgh University Press, 2007.
- Wright, Christopher, Gordon, Catherine May & Smith, Mary Peskett. British and Irish Paintings in Public Collections: An Index of British and Irish Oil Paintings by Artists Born Before 1870 in Public and Institutional Collections in the United Kingdom and Ireland. Yale University Press, 2006.
