= Ravenet =

- Ravenet is a surname. Notable people with the surname include:
- Simon François Ravenet (1706–1764), French engraver
- Simon Jean François Ravenet (1737–1821), French-born Italian engraver, Simon Françios's son, later known as Gian-Francesco Ravenet
- Juan Ravenet (1766–c. 1821), Italian-born Spanish painter and engraver, Gian-Francesco's son, originally known as Giovanni Ravenet
- Domingo Ravenet (1905–1969), Spanish-born Cuban painter and sculptor.
