= Plenas =

Coordinates: 41°07′N 0°58′W

- municipality
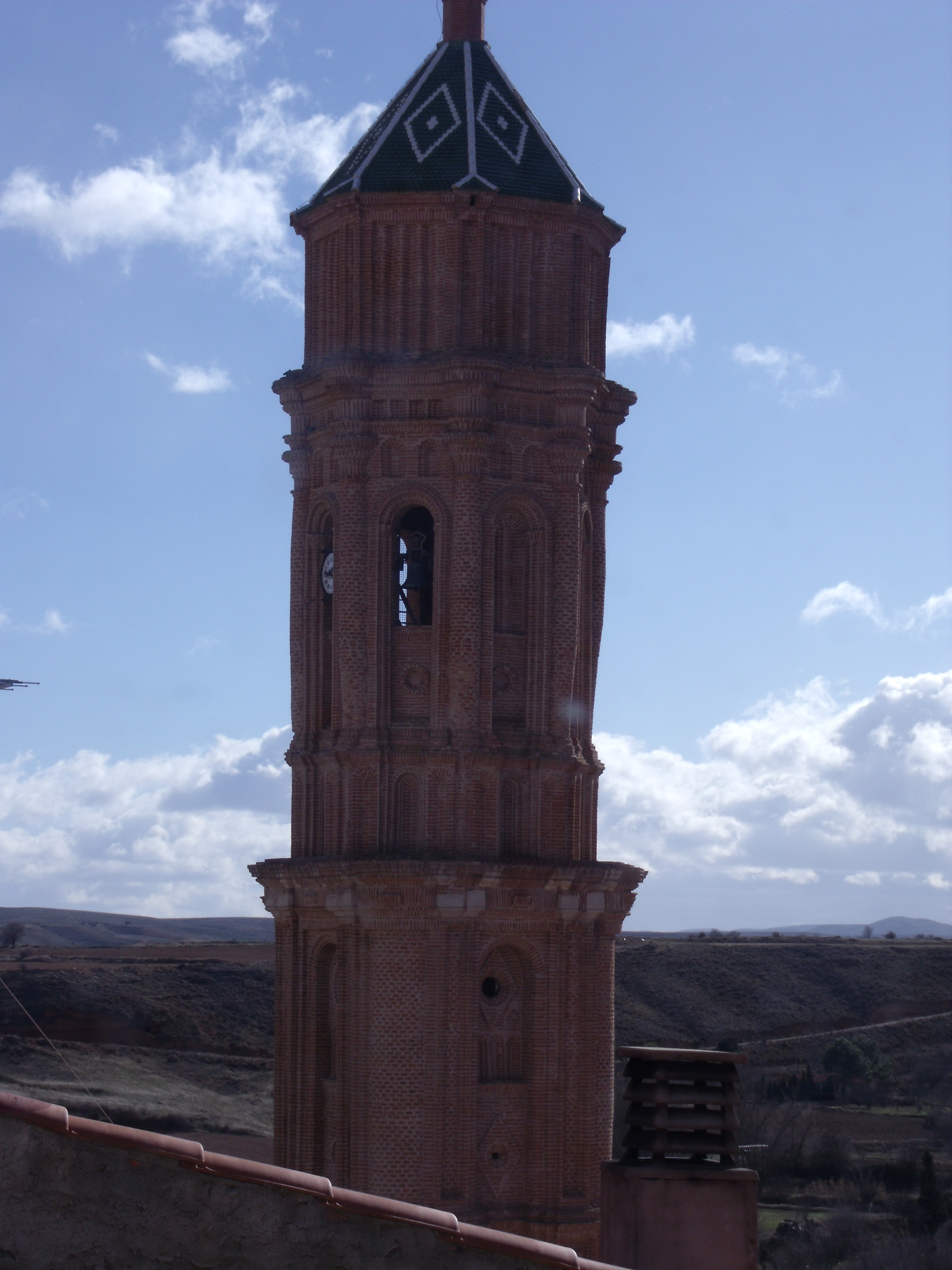

- Flag Coat of arms
- Interactive map of Plenas
- Country: Spain
- Autonomous community: Aragon
- Province: Zaragoza

Area
  - Total: 37 km^{2} (14 sq mi)

Population (2025-01-01)
  - Total: 110
  - Density: 3.0/km^{2} (7.7/sq mi)
- Time zone: UTC+1 (CET)
  - Summer (DST): UTC+2 (CEST)
- Climate: Cfb

Plenas is a municipality located in the Campo de Belchite comarca, province of Zaragoza, Aragon, Spain. According to the 2004 census (INE), the municipality has a population of 131 inhabitants.

It was the home town of the Aragonese revolutionary Manuela Sancho, who fought in the Siege of Zaragoza against the invading French Imperial Army. At the time of her birth, in 1784, the town had 825 inhabitants and 200 houses.

== See also ==
- List of municipalities in Zaragoza
