= Duke of Zaragoza =

Dukedom of Zaragoza
- Creation date: 17 July 1834
- Created by: Isabel II
- First holder: José de Palafox
- Present holder: Manuel Álvarez de Toledo y Mencos
- Remainder to: Heirs of the body of the grantee
- Status: Extant

Dukedom of Zaragoza (Spanish: Ducado de Zaragoza) is a hereditary title of Spanish nobility. It was created on 17 July 1834 by Queen Isabel II of Spain in favor of José de Palafox, a Spanish general. The title is accompanied by the dignity of Grandee of Spain.

== Dukes of Zaragoza (1834) ==
- José Rebolledo de Palafox, 1st Duke of Zaragoza (1775–1847)
- Francisco del Pilar Rebolledo de Palafox y Soler, 2nd Duke of Zaragoza (1815–1884)
- José Mencos y Rebolledo de Palafox, 3rd Duke of Zaragoza (1876–1961)
- Alonso Álvarez de Toledo y Mencos, 4th Duke of Zaragoza (1896–1990)
- Manuel Álvarez de Toledo y Mencos, 5th Duke of Zaragoza (1937–)

== Genealogy ==
Rebolledo de Palafox
Juan Felipe; 3rd Marquess of Lazán (1721–1799)
Luis; 4th Marquis of Lazán (1772–1843)	José; 1st Duke of Zaragoza (1775–1847)
Luis; 6th Marquis of Lazán (1806–1868)	Francisco del Pilar; 2nd Duke of Zaragoza (1815–1884)
Mencos
Joaquín María; 5th Marquis of La Real Defensa (1851–1936)	María del Pilar (1852–1879)
Álvarez de Toledo
Manuel Mariano; 6th Marquess de Miraflores (1868–1932)	María de la Blanca; 15th Marchioness of Navarrés (1873–1915)	José; 3rd Duke of Zaragoza (1876–1961)
Alonso; 4th Duke of Zaragoza (1896–1990)
Manuel; 5th Duke of Zaragoza (b. 1937)
Victoria Álvarez de Toledo y González
