= Juana Galán =

Guerrilla fighter of the Peninsular War (1787–1812)

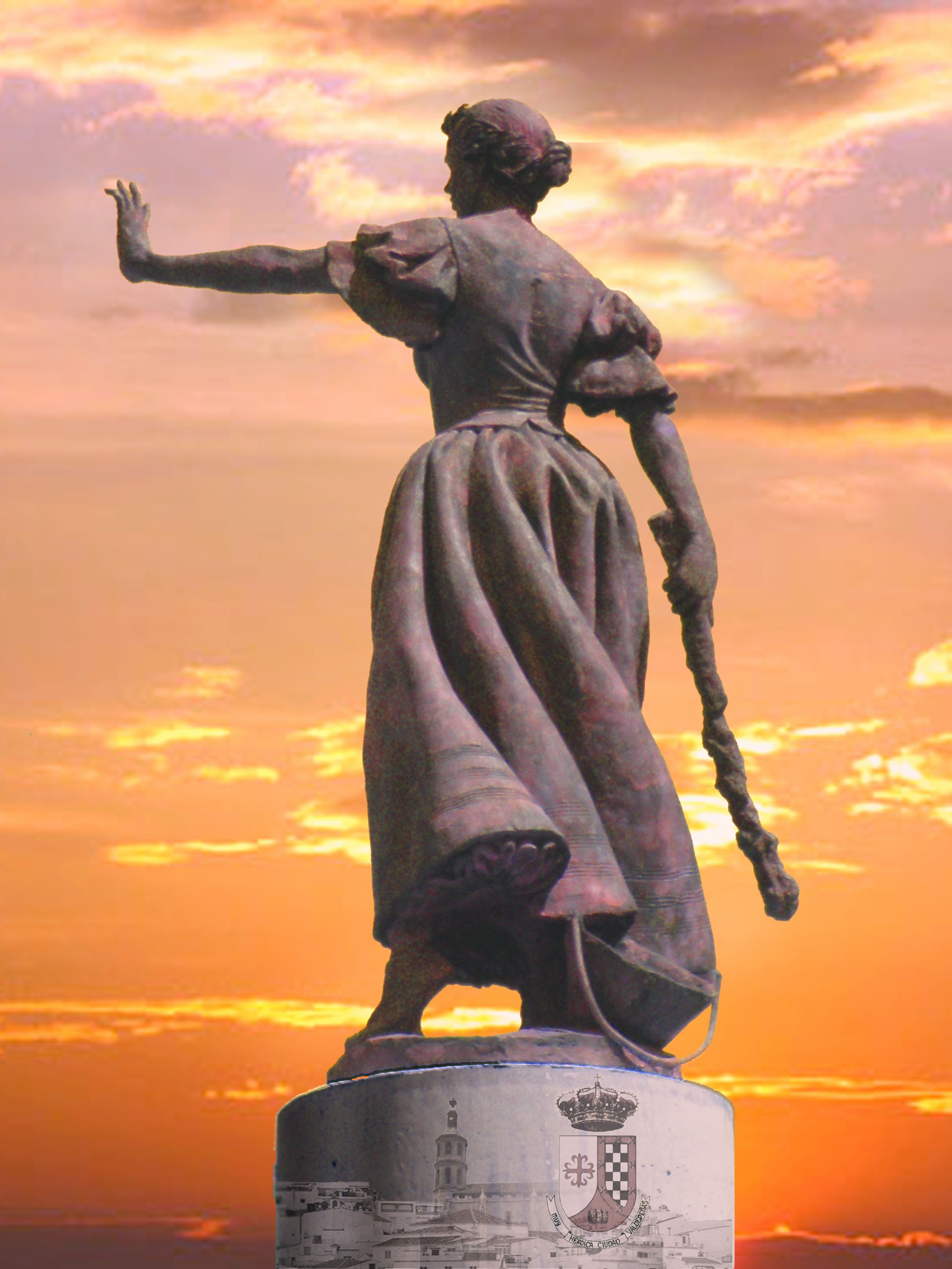
Statue of Juana Galán in Valdepeñas, by sculptor Francisco Javier Galán

Juana Galán (c. 1787– 24 September 1812), nicknamed La Galana, was a Spanish guerrilla fighter of the Peninsular War (1808–1814) who took to the street to fight against the French cavalry that tried to pass through the town of Valdepeñas. At twenty years old, she was considered the best informed woman of the village, because she worked in a strategic location, the first tavern in the village.

On 6 June 1808, in the Battle of Valdepeñas against Napoleon's troops, there was a lack of sufficient men to defend the village, so she encouraged women to go out and fight. Although Galán is usually depicted armed with a baton, one version has it that she smashed in the heads of the soldiers with her cast-iron stew pan. The other women poured hot water through the windows and boiling hot oil on the road.

This battle led, in part, to the French army abandoning the region of la Mancha, which in turn led to the decisive victory for the Spaniards at the Battle of Bailén. This town was granted the title "very heroic".

Galán married Bartolomé Ruiz de Lerma of Valdepeñas on 2 May 1810, with whom she had two daughters. She died during her second daughter's birth on 24 September 1812, the same day la Mancha was released by the troops of Napoleon. She was only around 25 years old.

== See also ==
- Agustina de Aragón
- Casta Álvarez
- María Pita
