= Battle of Castellón =

1809 battle of the Peninsular War

- Part of the Peninsular War
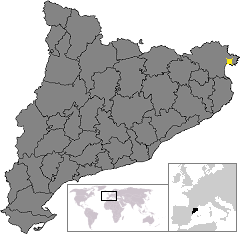
Date	1 January 1809
Location	Castelló d'Empúries, near Girona, Catalonia, Spain 42°15′N 3°05′E
Result	Spanish victory

Belligerents
(France) French Empire	Spain

Commanders and leaders
(France) Honoré Charles Reille	(Spain) Marqués de Lazán

Strength
500 regulars	

Casualties and losses
300 dead or wounded, 90 captured	

Peninsular War: Napoleon's invasion
current battle

The Battle of Castellón was an ambush against a French Imperial detachment under General Reille near Girona during the Peninsular War (1807–1814).

== Background ==
The Corunna campaign started with the Battle of Cardedeu.

== Battle ==
Having crept his force up along the right bank of the Fluvià River and set up headquarters at La Armentera, a village near the river mouth on the Mediterranean Sea, General Lazán prepared a coup de main against the French battalion installed atop Castelló d'Empúries. Since bad roads precluded a night attack, Lazán moved in the early morning, and brusquely forced the French off the ridge. While Reille's troops effected a disciplined fighting withdrawal toward Rosas, Juan Clarós's Chasseurs, acting as the vanguard for General Álvarez de Castro's division, circled across their path of retreat and set up a position in a grove next to the main road, preparing to block the French passage. Caught in a pincer movement, the French were cut down. Only 80 escaped unwounded and 90 surrendered.

== Sequel ==
When Reille, established at Figueras, learned of the rout of his men, he set out against the Spaniards the next day with 3,000 infantry and cavalry, aiming to cut their communications with Gerona. In spite of the rapid French movements, Reille was unable to achieve a surprise, and Lazán awaited him with his men solidly entrenched at Castellón. Seeing his attacks repulsed everywhere along the line, Reille decided not to try conclusions with the Spaniards, and Lazán fell back on Gerona unmolested.

== Aftermath ==
The Corunna campaign proceeded with the Battle of Mansilla.

== Commemorations ==
Ferdinand VII, the king of Spain, awarded a commemorative medal to recognize the participants in the battle.

== See also ==
- Timeline of the Peninsular War

Preceded by Battle of Benavente	Napoleonic Wars; Battle of Castellón	Succeeded by Battle of Uclés (1809)
