= The Defence of Saragossa =

Painting by David Wilkie

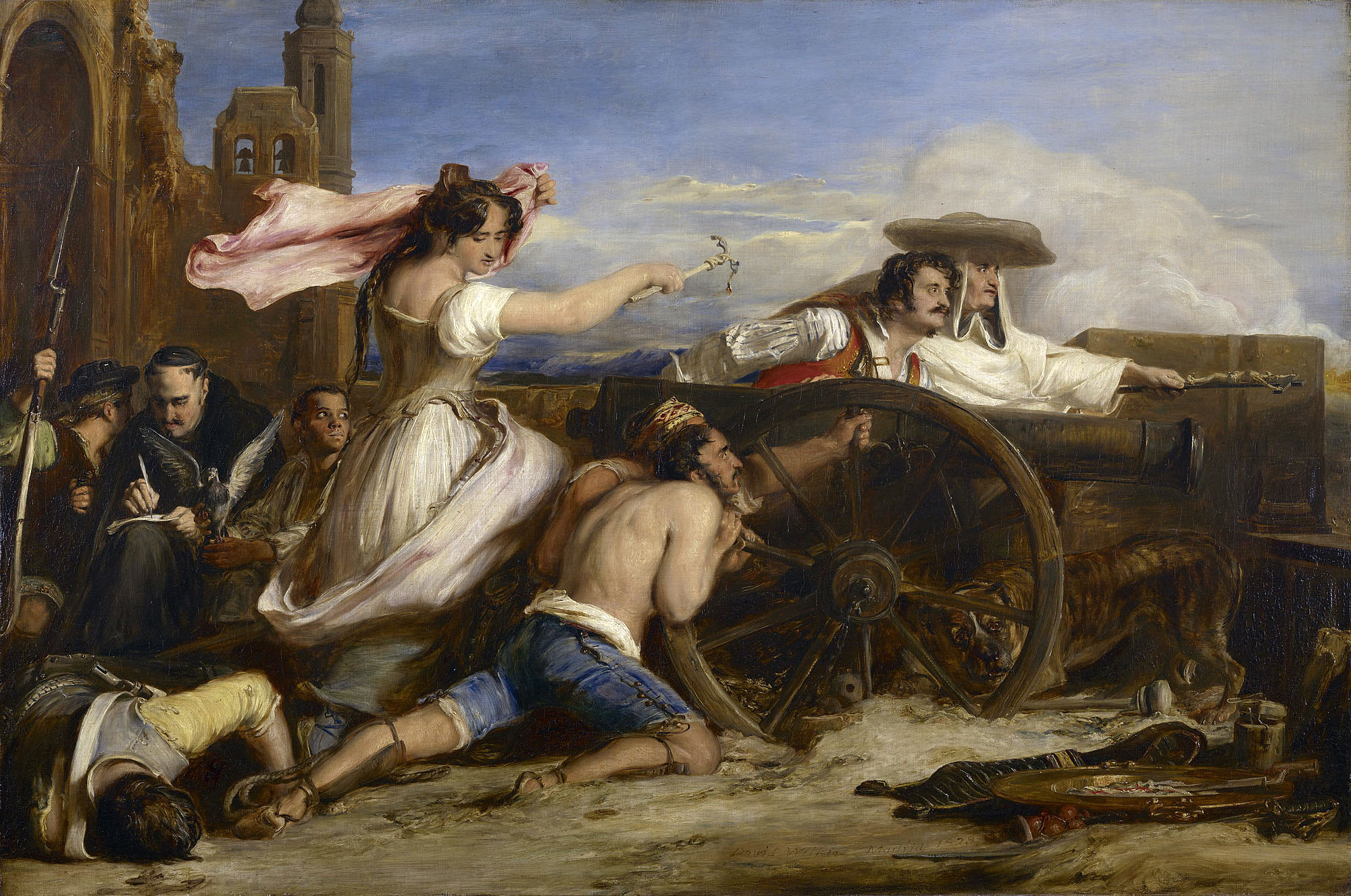
- Artist: David Wilkie
- Year: 1828
- Type: Oil on canvas, history painting
- Dimensions: 94 cm × 141 cm (37 in × 56 in)
- Location: Royal Collection, Windsor Castle

The Defence of Saragossa is an 1828 history painting by the British artist David Wilkie. It depicts a scene from the 1808 Siege of Zaragoza during the Peninsular War.

Wilkie, a London-based Scottish painter, had recently travelled through Spain and this was one of a series of four works he produced featuring scenes of Spanish resistance to the French occupiers in the Peninsular War.

Wilkie was inspired by the story of Agustina de Aragón who stepped over the fallen body of her husband to fire a cannon at the French in defence of the city. The painting was bought by George IV following its exhibition at the Royal Academy's 1829 Summer Exhibition at Somerset House. It remains in the Royal Collection.

== See also ==
- The Maid of Saragossa, an 1842 work by Benjamin Robert Haydon

== Bibliography ==
- Holland, Robert. The Warm South: How the Mediterranean Shaped the British Imagination. Yale University Press, 2018.
- Tromans, Nicholas. David Wilkie: The People's Painter. Edinburgh University Press, 2007.
