= Assault on Saragossa =

Painting by January Suchodolski

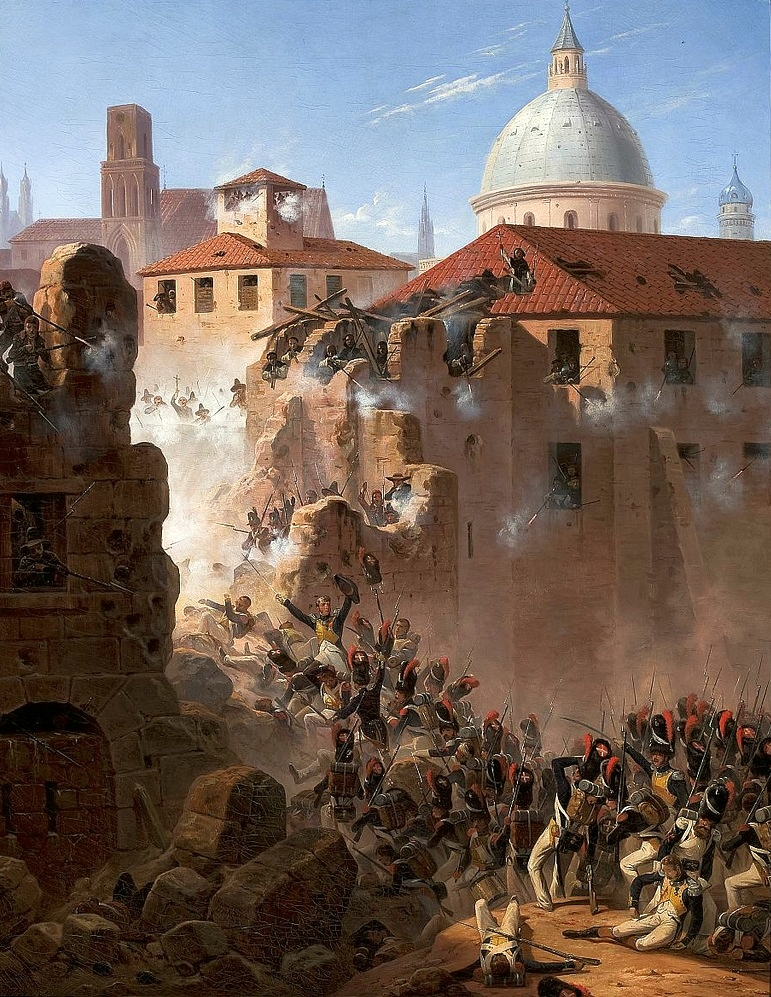
- Artist: January Suchodolski
- Year: 1845
- Type: Oil on canvas, history painting
- Dimensions: 115.5 cm × 92 cm (45.5 in × 36 in)
- Location: National Museum; Warsaw

Assault on Saragossa is a history painting of 1845 by the Polish artist January Suchodolski. It depicts the Siege of Zaragoza of 1808 during the Peninsular War, part of the wider Napoleonic Wars. French troops are shown assaulting a breach in the wall of the Spanish city. Spanish fighters crowd the windows above them, firing muskets at the French soldiers. The siege ended in a Spanish victory, inspiring the Guerrilla War against the French occupiers and encouraging military intervention from the British Army based in Portugal. Nonetheless, later in the year the French returned and captured the city. Suchodolski had been a student of the French artist Horace Vernet, and visually the work reflects the style of Vernet. Today the painting is in the National Museum in Warsaw.

== Bibliography ==
- Aymes, Jean René. La nación en armas: España 1808–1814. Sociedad Estatal de Conmemoraciones Culturales, 2008.
- Fijalkowski, Wieslaw Felix . La intervención de tropas polacas en los sitios de Zaragoza de 1808 y 1809. Institución "Fernando el Católico", 1997.
- Morawińska, Agnieszka. Polish Painting, 15th- to 20th Century. Auriga, 1984.
