= Luis Rebolledo de Palafox, 4th Marquis of Lazán =

Spanish military officer

Luis Rebolledo de Palafox 4th Marquis of Lazán
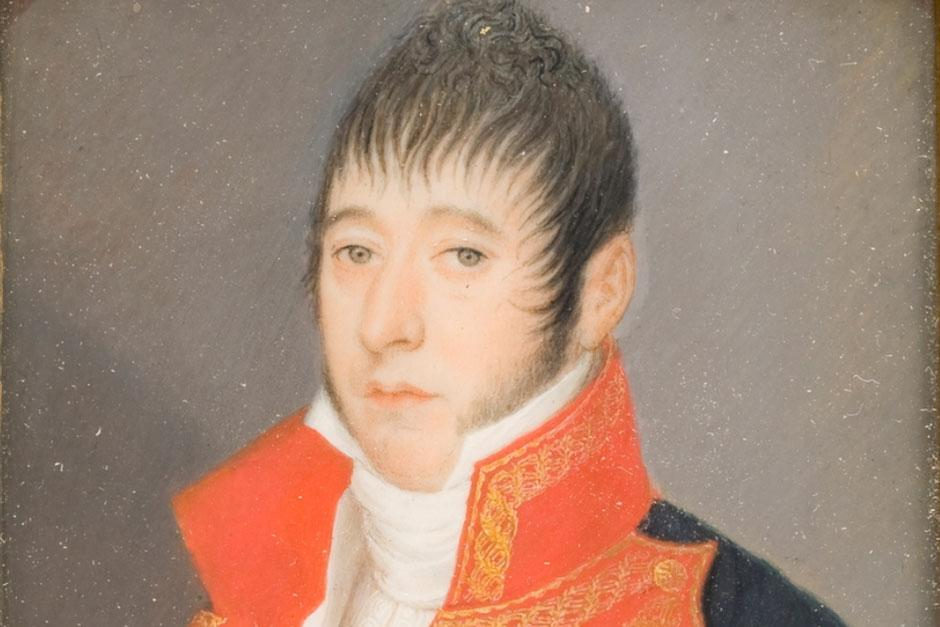
- Born: 2 June 1772; Zaragoza, Aragón
- Died: 28 December 1843 (aged 71); Madrid
- Military career
- Allegiance: Spain
- Conflicts: Peninsular War; Battle of Tudela; Siege of Zaragoza; Battle of Castellón

Luis Rebolledo de Palafox y Melzi, 4th Marquis of Lazán, 9th Marquis of San Felices de Aragón (June 2, 1772 – December 28, 1843) was a Spanish military commander during the Peninsular War.

== Biography ==
Alongside his two younger brothers José de Palafox, the Duke of Zaragoza, and Francisco Palafox, Lazán was a national hero in 19th century Spain for his defence of Zaragoza from the French Imperial armies in 1808 and 1809.

Lazán was born to Juan Felipe Rebolledo de Palafox and doña Paula Melzi d'Eril and educated at the St. Thomas Aquinas College of the Pious Schools of Zaragoza in Zaragoza.

Lazán was promoted to brigadier in 1802, the same promotion as one of his younger brothers, Francisco, and two other leading commanders of the Peninsular War, Joaquín Blake and the Count of Caldagues.

In 1809 he commanded an army in the campaign for Catalonia, winning a notable success at Castellón.

Upon the restoration of Ferdinand VII to the Spanish Crown in 1814 (Treaty of Valençay), Lazán aligned himself with the reactionary party defending Ferdinand's absolute monarchy and opposing the liberal Constitution of 1812. From 1815 to 1820 Lazán served as Captain General of Aragon.

=== Marriage and children ===
He married on 10 April with María Gabriela de Palafox y Portocarrero (1779–1823), daughter of María Francisca de Sales Portocarrero y Zúñiga, and had :

- Joaquín Rebolledo de Palafox y Palafox (died 1862), 5th marquess of Lazán, no issue
- Luis Rebolledo de Palafox y Palafox (1806-1868), 6th marquess of Lazan, had issue.

== Bibliography ==
- "Palafox y Melci, Luis Rebolledo de, marqués de Lazán". Gran Enciclopedia Aragonesa. DiCom Medios, S.L. Archived from the original on February 17, 2012.
