= Fernando Brambila =

Italian painter

Malaspina Expedition

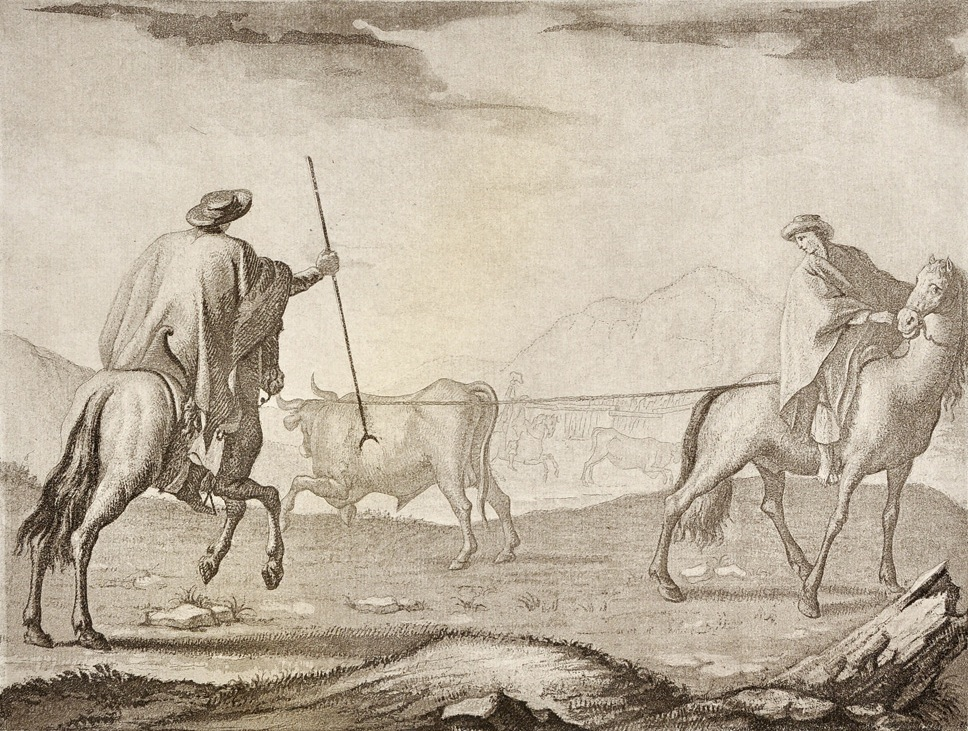
Roping Cattle on the Pampas

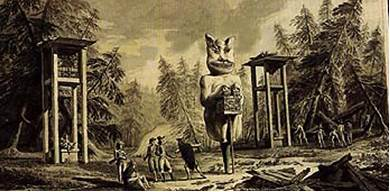
Tlingit Totem in Alaska

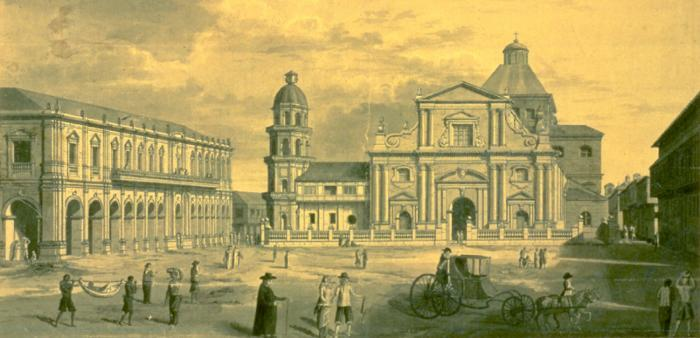
Manila Cathedral

Fernando Brambila, or Ferdinando Brambilla, (12 July 1763 – 23 January 1834) was an Italian painter and engraver who spent most of his life in Spain, where he worked for the Royal Court. He is best known for his participation in the Malaspina Expedition.

== Biography ==
Brambila was born in Cassano d'Adda on 12 July 1763. He decided to become an artist at an early age and worked as a painter in Milan, where he studied with Giocondo Albertolli at the Brera Academy. His early style was heavily influenced by the French painter Claude Joseph Vernet.

In 1790, he was working as a set designer and scenery painter at La Scala when Francesco Melzi d'Eril and Count Paolo Greppi, on behalf of the Spanish government, proposed that he be added to the Malaspina Expedition as one of the official artists. Brambila was hired alongside Giovanni Ravenet, a painter from Parma, to replace artists who had resigned.

Siege of Zaragoza

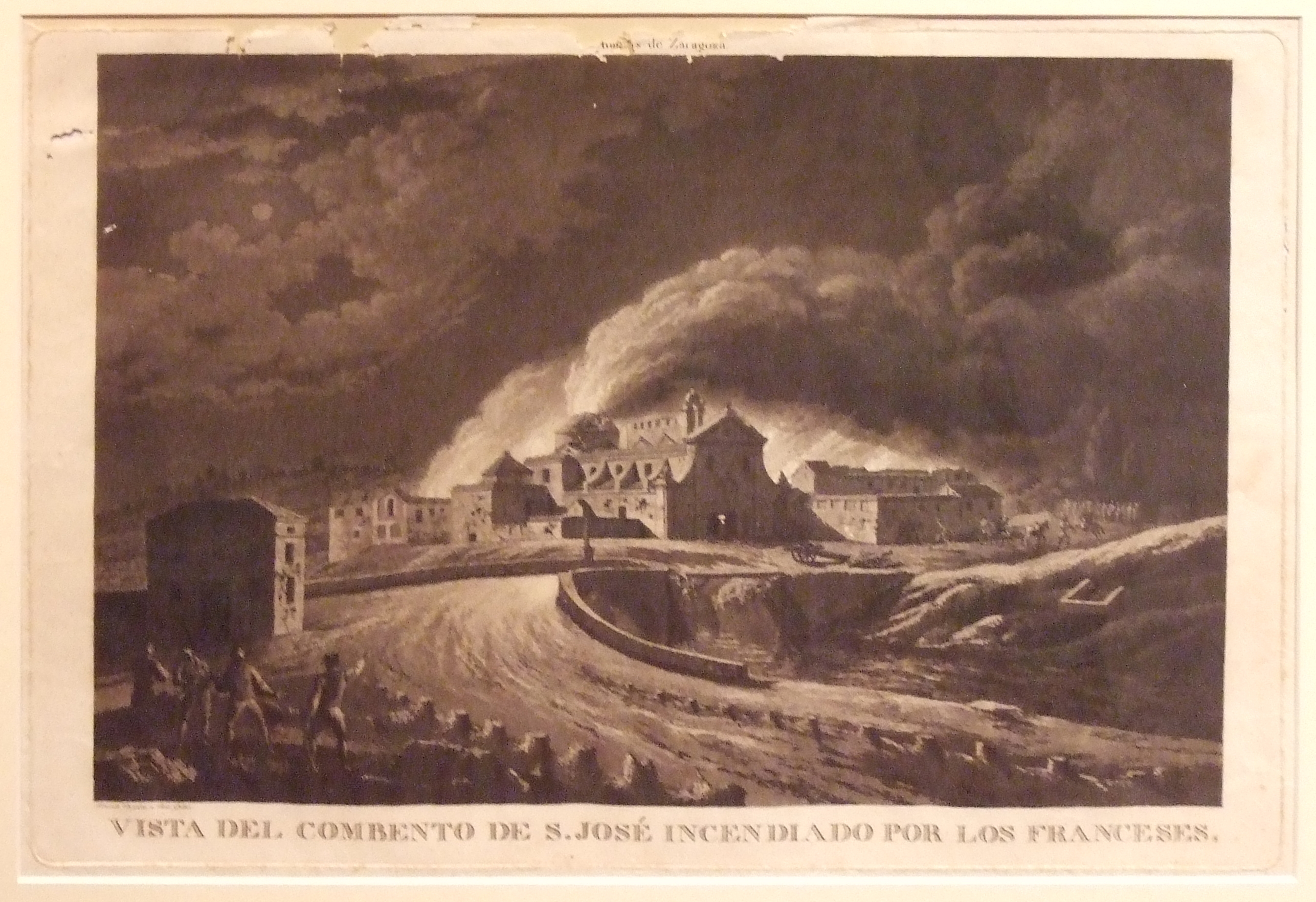
The Convent of San José, Torched by the French

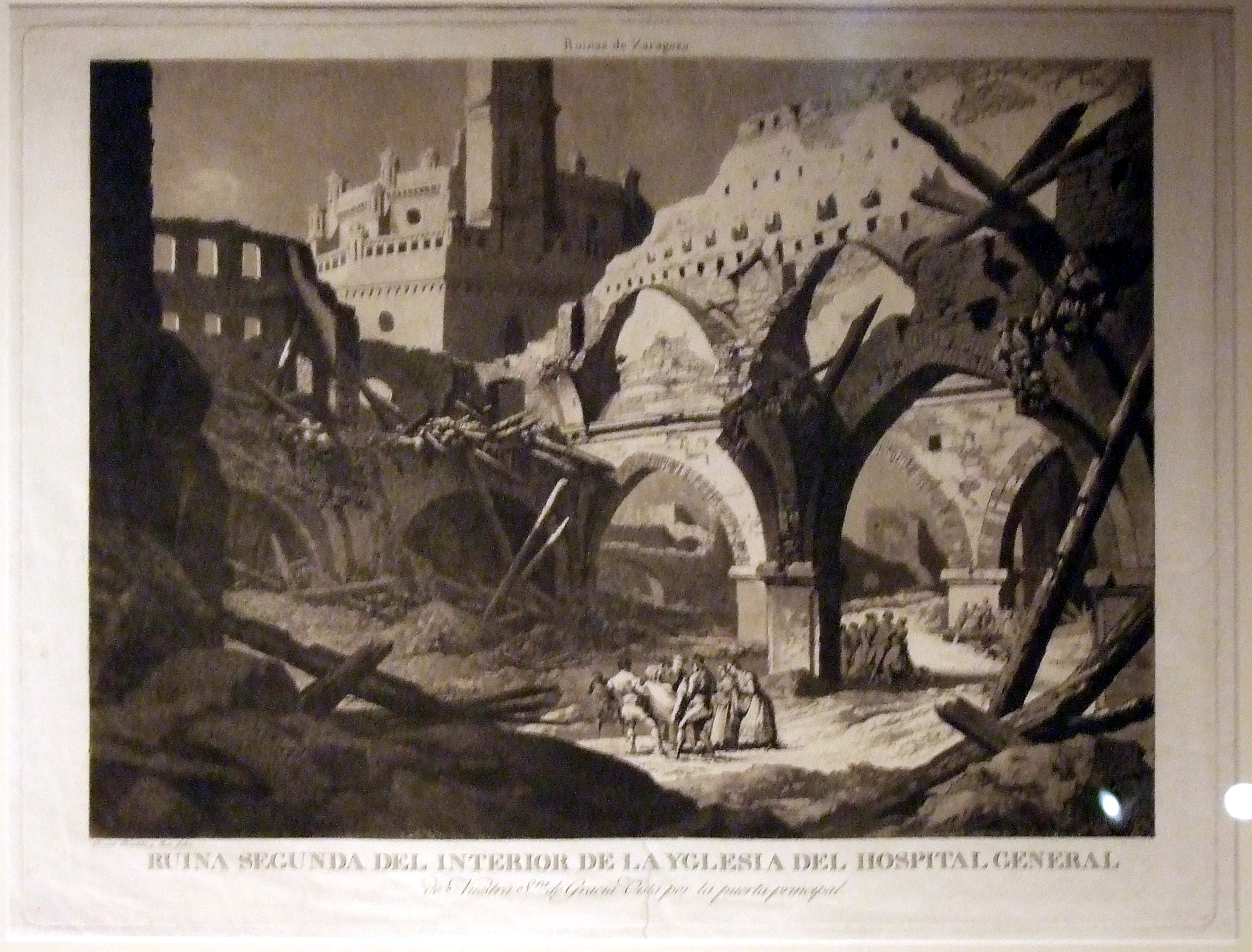
Ruins of the General Hospital

In April 1791, he began his journey to join the expedition. After making his way to La Coruña, he boarded the frigate El Cortés, headed for America. He met with the expedition at Acapulco, where he executed his first paintings. The naturalist Antonio Pineda later claimed that Brambila also travelled about to paint Aztec antiquities, but these works have not been found.

He was stationed aboard the corvette Atrevida. His paintings included numerous panoramic views with the precise details of defensive systems, monuments etc.; from Guam, the Mariana Islands, Palapa, Sorsogon City and Zamboanga in the Philippines, Macao, Port Jackson and Parramatta in Australia, Vava'u, Lima, Buenos Aires and Montevideo.

Brambila and Ravenet returned together in 1795 and remained in Spain, working for the government at a rate of 27,000 reales per year, as stipulated in their contract. He created lithographs and engravings based on his paintings for a book on the expedition. In 1799, on the occasion of Cardinal Luis María de Borbón's elevation to Archbishop of Toledo, he designed and created a triumphal arch for the Cathedral. That same year, King Carlos IV named him "Painter, Architect and Decorator for the Royal Court". He was married the following year, but had only one son before becoming a widower.

Royal Sites

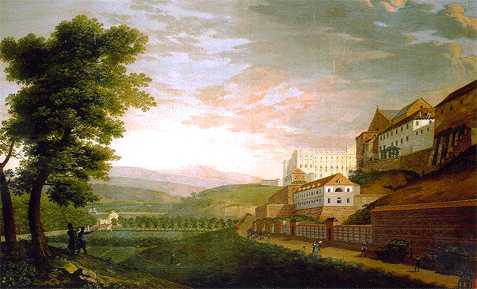
Royal Palace, Cuesta de la Vega

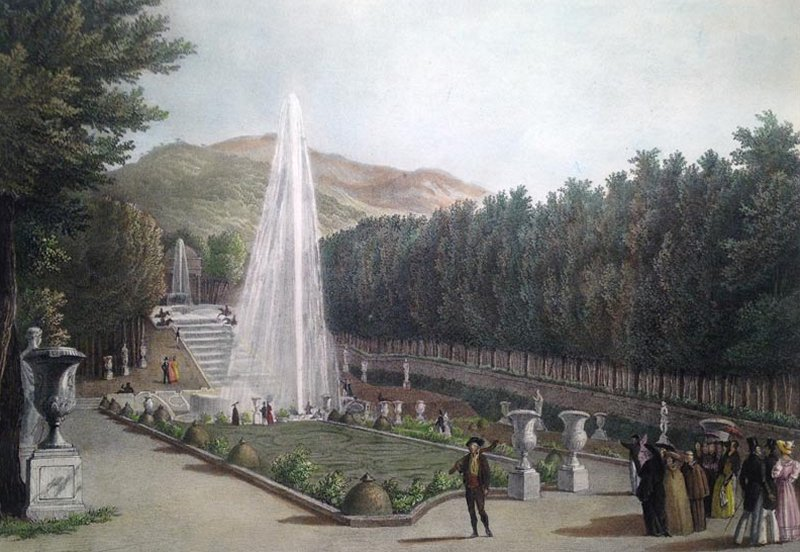
La Granja Fountain, Aranjuez

== After the expedition ==
In May 1806, his contract expired. He and Ravenet presented all of their works to Count José Espinosa y Tello, Director of the Hydrographic Office. Two years later, following the Siege of Zaragoza, Brambila and his fellow artist Juan Gálvez went there by invitation of General José de Palafox to create a graphic record of the event's aftermath. Thirty-two of these drawings were later published as Grabados de la Ruina de Zaragoza. He briefly returned to Madrid, then fled to Cádiz when it became obvious that Napoleon's troops would take the city.

Following the end of the Peninsular War, Brambila went back to Madrid where he took up his position as Court Painter under the new king Fernando VII. In 1814, he was appointed the Director of Perspective and Decorative Art at the Real Academia de Bellas Artes de San Fernando and became an Academician of Merit the following year.

In 1817, the Academy published his Tratado de Principios Elementales de Perspectiva. Four years later, he was commissioned to create a series of paintings and lithographs depicting royal sites, including El Escorial, Aranjuez, Buen Retiro, and Moncloa Palace; Brambila worked on this project until 1832. The final pieces were published as Vistas de los Sitios Reales y Madrid.

Brambila had suffered from a serious illness in 1829 and never fully recovered. After seeking cures at various spas, he died at his home in Madrid in 1834.
