= Juan Ravenet =

Italian painter and engraver

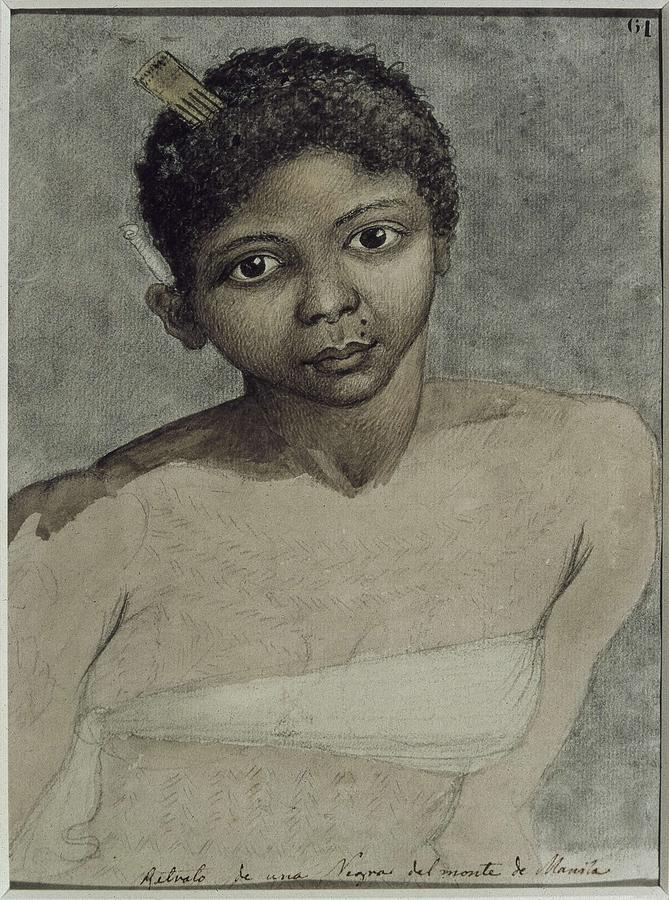
Woman from the Mountains near Manila

Juan Ravenet, or Giovanni Ravenet (1766, Sala Baganza - c.1821, Madrid) was an Italian painter and engraver of French ancestry who received his education in Parma. He is primarily known for participating in the Malaspina Expedition.

== Biography ==
His father was the French-born engraver, Gian Francesco Ravenet (originally, Simon Jean François Ravenet), who worked for the Duchy of Parma. His grandfather, Simon François Ravenet, was also a well-known engraver. He studied at the Accademia di Belle Arti di Parma, where he stood out as a portraitist.

Together with the painter, Fernando Brambila, he joined the scientific mission led by Alejandro Malaspina in Acapulco, Mexico, in 1791. He was commissioned to paint portraits of the people they encountered and scenes from daily life. Upon completing the mission, he remained in Spain, as part of his contract; continuing to produce drawings and engravings for the Royal Court.

After Malaspina fell out of favor, he lost his position and suffered financial problems, but was able to support himself by working for the Spanish Navy. During the Peninsular War, his loyalties were questioned because of his French origins and he had to take refuge in France. He later returned to Madrid and died there; probably in 1821. His works from the expedition were not published until many years after his death.
