= Cabañas de Ebro =

Cabañas de Ebro, Spain
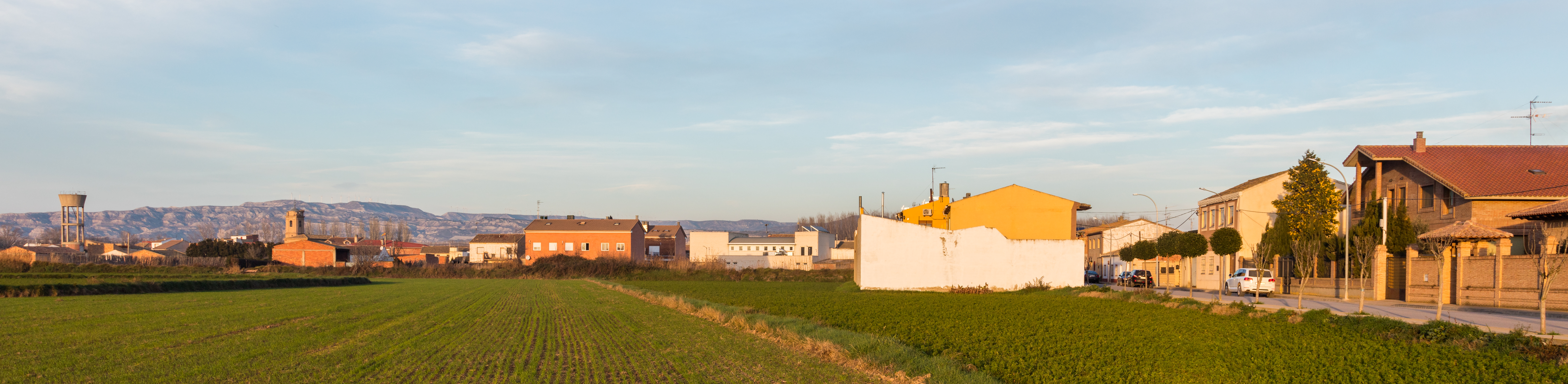

- Flag Coat of arms

- Location within Aragon Location within Spain Location within Europe
- Country: Spain
- Autonomous community: Aragon
- Province: Zaragoza
- Municipality: Cabañas de Ebro

Area
  - Total: 8 km^{2} (3.1 sq mi)

Population (2025-01-01)
  - Total: 473
  - Density: 59/km^{2} (150/sq mi)
- Time zone: UTC+1 (CET)
  - Summer (DST): UTC+2 (CEST)

Cabañas de Ebro is a municipality located in the province of Zaragoza, Aragon, Spain. According to the 2004 census (INE), the municipality has a population of 522 inhabitants.

== See also ==
- List of municipalities in Zaragoza
