= Siege of Zaragoza (1808) =

1808 siege of the Peninsular War

- Part of the Peninsular War
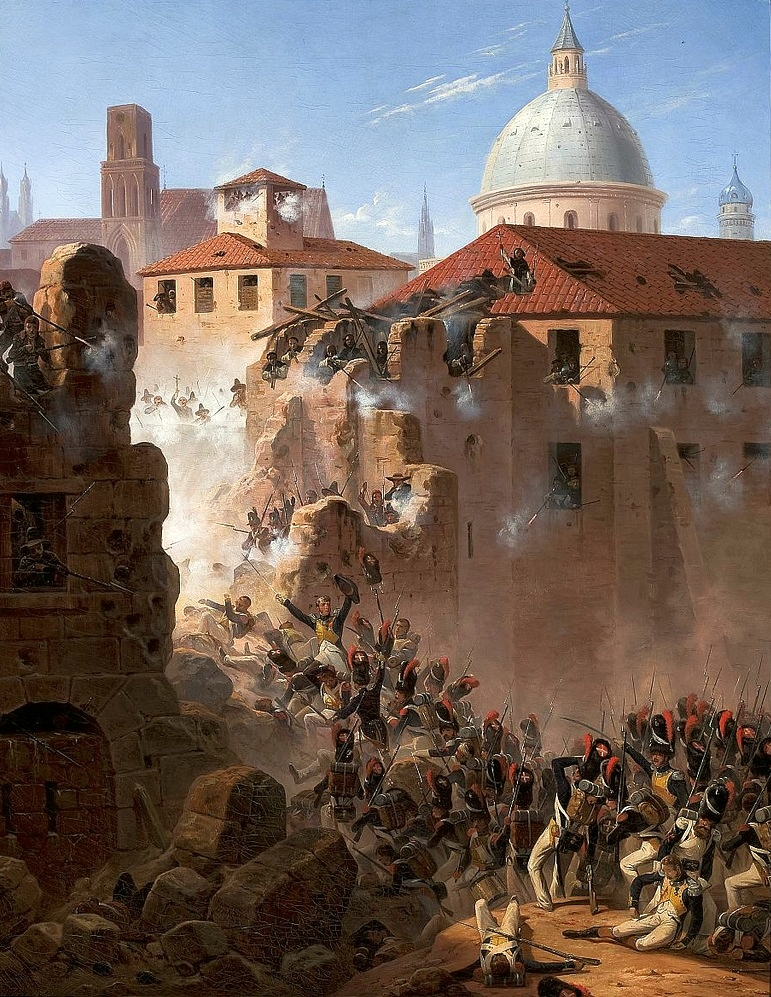
- Assault on Saragossa; January Suchodolski, 1845
Date	15 June – 14 August 1808
Location	Zaragoza, Spain 41°39′N 0°53′W
Result	Spanish victory

Belligerents
(First French Empire) French Empire; Duchy of Warsaw	Spain

Commanders and leaders
(First French Empire) Charles Lefebvre-Desnouettes; (First French Empire) Jean-Antoine Verdier	José de Palafox; Felipe de Marcq (Spain) Juan O'Neylle

Strength
9,500–15,500	13,000

Casualties and losses
3,500 killed, wounded or captured	3,000–5,000 killed, wounded or captured

Peninsular War: Spanish uprising 1808
current battle

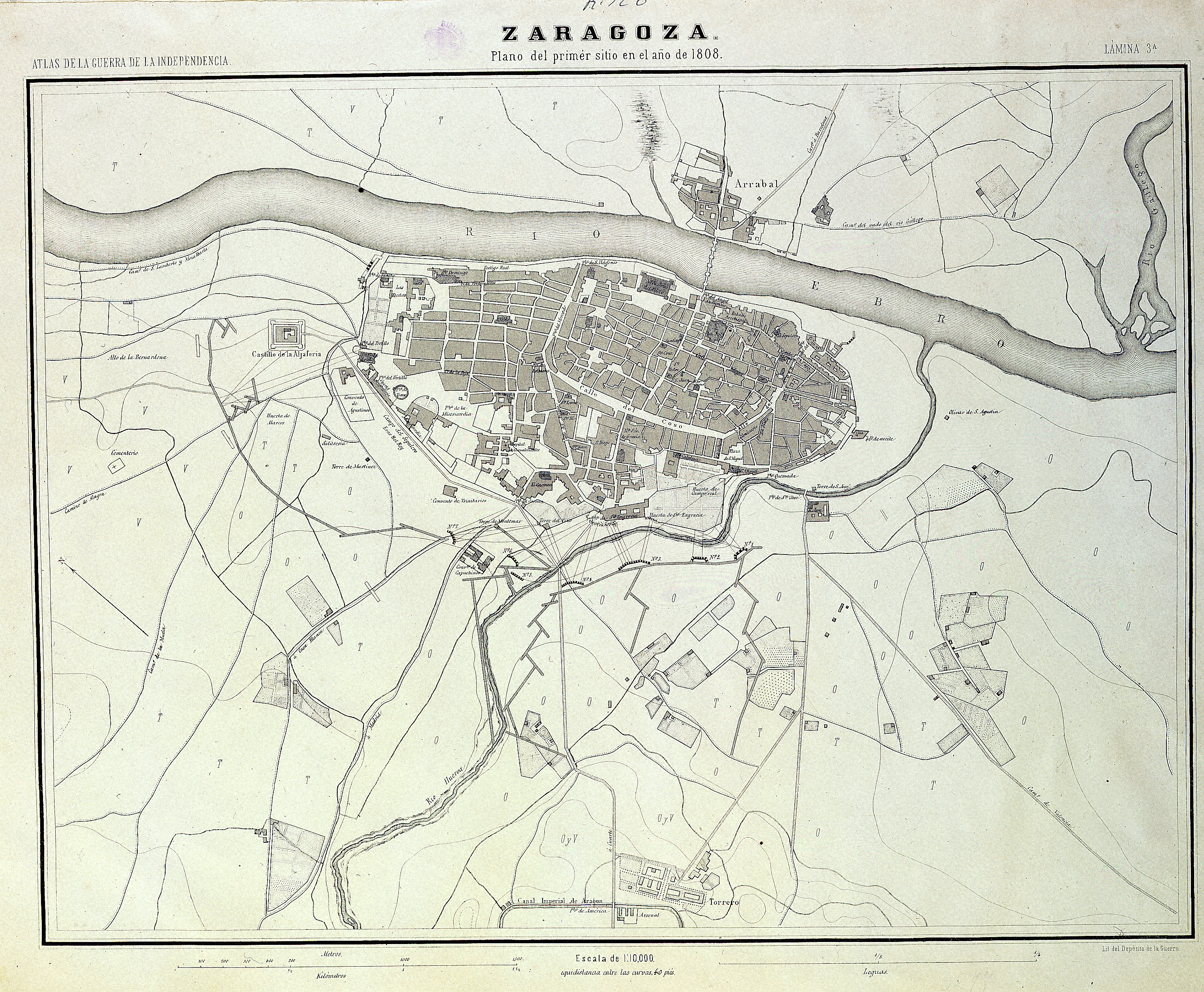
Map (1868) of the first siege of Zaragoza

The siege of Zaragoza (also known as the siege of Saragossa) was a bloody struggle in the Peninsular War. A French army under General Lefebvre-Desnouettes and subsequently commanded by General Jean-Antoine Verdier besieged, repeatedly stormed, and was repulsed from the Spanish city of Zaragoza in the summer of 1808.

== Background ==
The Spanish conventional warfare had started with the Battles of El Bruch. Napoleon at first thought that they were a series of isolated uprisings and despatched a number of small columns to quell them. In Northeastern Spain Marshal Bessières assigned General Lefebvre-Desnouettes to quell the revolt in Aragon. Eventually his column included 5,000 infantry, 1,000 cavalry and two artillery batteries. Lefebvre quickly discovered, however, that the revolt was much more widespread than had been believed.

The Spanish side was led by General José de Palafox who was the second son in an aristocratic Spanish family. He was appointed Captain-General of Aragon in late May. He successfully raised a force of 7,500 troops but was handicapped by the lack of experience of these troops with only about 300 experienced cavalry and a few gunners.

Palafox made a few attempts to stop the French from even reaching Zaragoza. His elder brother Luis Rebolledo de Palafox, 4th Marquis of Lazán attempted to stop them at Tudela on 8 June 1808 and again at Mallen on 13 June 1808. Palafox then sent out a force of 6,000 but was defeated again at Alagon on 14 June 1808 and Palafox himself was wounded. Finally the remaining Spanish forces retreated into Zaragoza.

== The siege ==
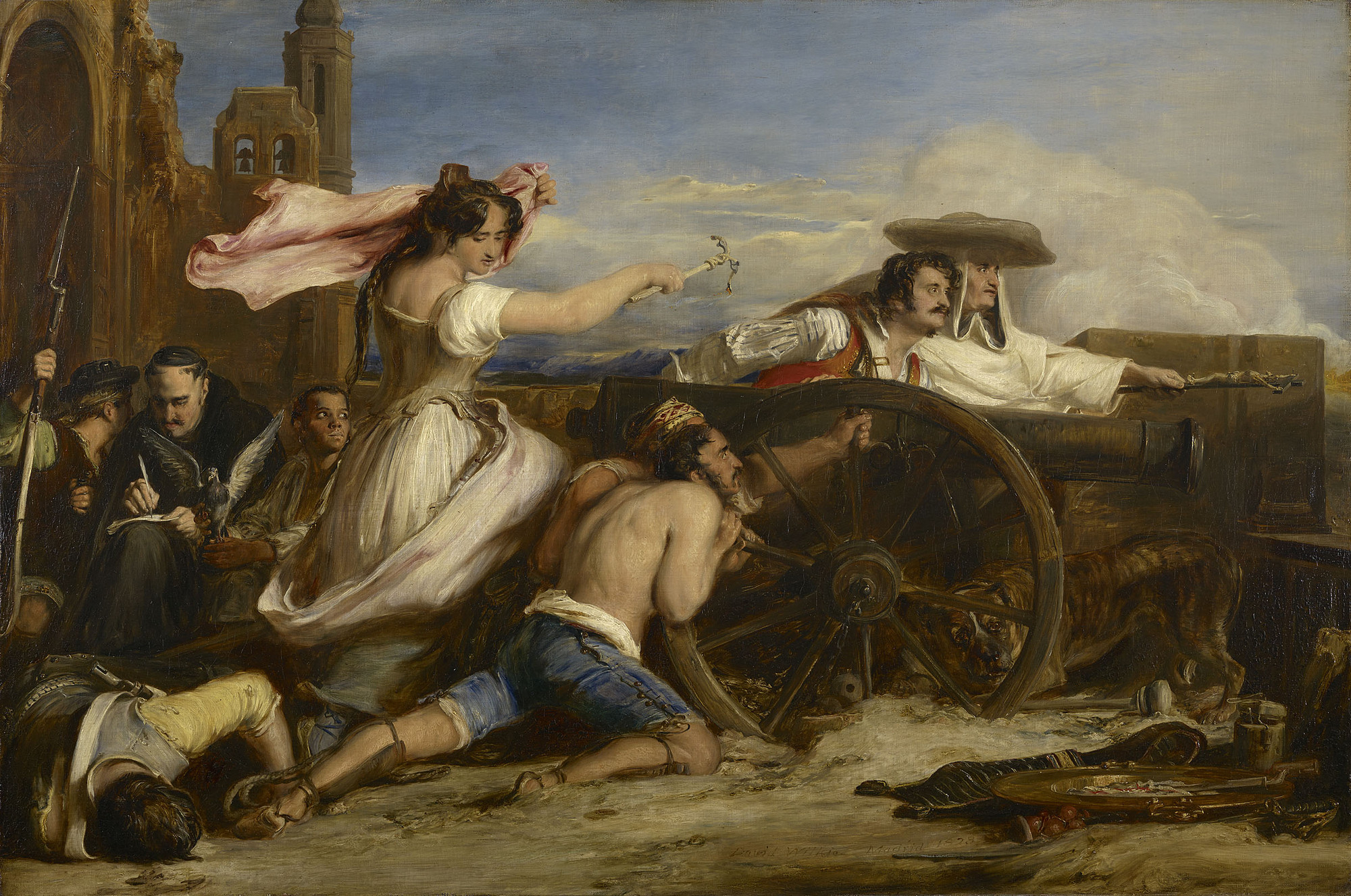
The Defence of Saragossa by David Wilkie, 1828.

Zaragoza itself was protected by two medieval walls and two rivers – the Ebro river to the north-east and the Huerva to the south – but the west was exposed to attack. The strength of the city, though, was in its maze of strongly built defensible buildings with narrow lanes easy to block with barricades.

Lefebvre reached Zaragoza on 15 June 1808. At this time he was badly outnumbered by the Spanish, who had around 11,000 troops although only half had experience of battle from the Alagon defeat.

The next day Lefebvre assaulted the western wall of the city expecting that the Spanish would collapse quickly.

In the first assault the French broke into the western part of the city and their allies Polish troops of Legia Nadwiślańska broke through the Gate of Carmen and took the monastery of the same name, while Polish cavalry broke through the Santa Engracia Gate and fought their way into the center of the city. However, due to complete lack of support from the French they were ordered to leave downtown and retreat (for which Polish cavalry commander colonel Jan Konopka literally called French troops "cowards"). In this first assault the French suffered around 700 casualties and Poles lost about 50 troops (killed or wounded - mainly infantry and few cavalry).

Palafox himself was not present on that day. He had left to raise additional troops in Upper Aragon to attack Lefebvre's lines of communication. Palafox raised an additional force of 5,000 troops but these were defeated at Épila on the 23–24 June 1808 and Palafox returned to Zaragoza with only an additional 1,000 troops.

The French, however, received more substantial reinforcements with a force of 3,000 led by General Jean-Antoine Verdier arriving on 26 June 1808. As General Verdier was senior to Lefebvre he took over command of all the troops. Further reinforcements continued to arrive including some siege artillery.

On 28 June 1808 Verdier attacked Monte Torrero on the southern bank of the Huerva river. Monte Torrero was a hill that dominated the south of Zaragoza and should have been strongly fortified but was not. As a result, the hill was captured with ease and the Spanish commander, Colonel Vincento Falco, was subsequently court-martialled and shot.

Now that Monte Torrero was in his hands, Verdier was able to use it as a base for his siege artillery. Starting from midnight on 30 June 1808 thirty siege guns, four mortars, and twelve howitzers opened fire on Zaragoza and kept firing continuously.

A second assault was made by the French on 2 July 1808 with twice the strength of the first assault. Although the fixed defences in Zaragoza had suffered heavily from the bombardment, the barricades were still intact and Palafox had returned to take command.

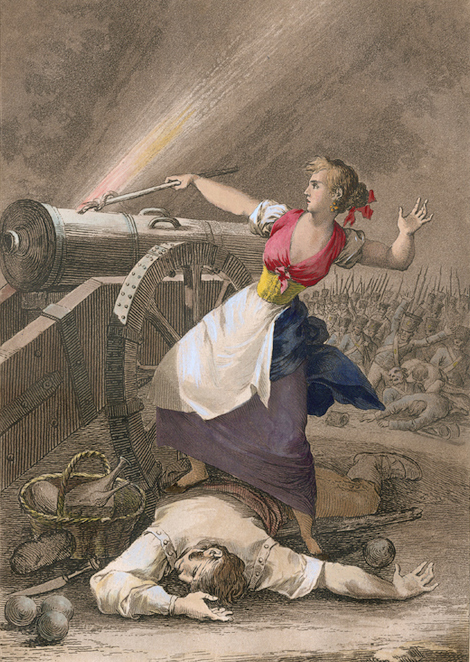
Agustina Zaragoza, by Fernando Brambila

The French penetrated the city in several places but were unable to make any further progress and once again were forced to retreat. This assault became famous for the story of the Maid of Aragon: Agustina Saragossa. Her lover was an artillery sergeant at the Portillo Gate. The entire crew of his gun were killed before they could fire off their last round. Agustina ran forward taking the lighted match from her dead lover's hands and fired the cannon. The French were hit by a round of grapeshot at close range and their attack was broken. Palafox said he personally witnessed this event and Agustina was commissioned as a sub-lieutenant.

During this assault on 2 July 1808 the French suffered 200 dead and 300 wounded. Verdier therefore decided not to make any further assaults and settled down for a siege. Unfortunately for him he had insufficient men to fully blockade the city and the Spanish were able to be supplied from the north bank of the Ebro river most of the time.

In the second half of July the French concentrated on capturing the Capuchin and Trinitarian convents of San Jose, which were to the west of Zaragoza. By 24 July 1808 these were all captured by the French.

On 4 August the French began a heavy artillery bombardment and silenced the Spanish guns and made several breaches in the walls. At 2pm Verdier launched a massive assault with thirteen battalions in three columns and penetrated deep into Zaragoza. Verdier demanded Palafox's surrender to which he replied "War to the knife".

By evening the French had taken half of the city but the Spanish counter-attacked and pushed the French out except for a small wedge surrounded by the Spanish.

By this time the French had suffered around 462 killed and 1,505 wounded. The Spanish had suffered similar or even higher losses but still outnumbered the French.

The fighting continued for several days but the assault had effectively failed ensuring the failure of the siege. On 19 July 1808 a French army under General Dupont were forced to surrender at Bailén and this made both sides realise the French would have to retreat. Palafox halted his offensive operations, but Verdier responded with an artillery bombardment to use up all the ammunition he could not carry away.

Finally on 14 August 1808 Verdier blew up all the strongpoints he held and withdrew. Among the strongpoints was the abbey of Santa Engracia, which was blown up. This was the end of the first siege of Zaragoza.

In total the French had 3,500 casualties during the siege. Spanish losses of 2,000 were admitted at the time; however, a figure of 5,000 is more probable.

== Aftermath ==
The Spanish conventional warfare proceeded with the Battle of Medina de Rioseco.

Palafox's resistance made him a national hero, a glory he shared with Agustina Saragossa and many other ordinary civilians. Zaragoza would endure a second, longer, more famous siege, starting in late December. When it finally fell to the French in 1809, Zaragoza had become a city of corpses and smoking rubble: 12,000 people would remain of a prewar population of over 70,000.

Also, in Polish history, the sieges of Zaragoza, as well as the earlier Haitian Revolution and later Battle of Somosierra, became cultural icons and are often brought up as examples of terrible political misuse of Polish soldiers by Napoleonic France. The Poles had allied with France and supported Napoleon to fight Prussia, Russia and Austria - the countries that partitioned Poland a few years earlier. Having lost their own country to invading powers, they objected to fight the nations or countries that were fighting for their own freedom too. Polish general Chłopicki commended col. Konopka for the decision to not fight Spanish civilians and giving up Zaragoza's downtown when the French couldn't break through and secure it (which basically ended the first siege). Chłopicki, who later lead the charge of Polish troops during the second siege of Zaragoza, also forbade his troops to fight Spanish civilians, unless directly attacked (thus enormously upsetting French commanders, like gen. Foy). Basically, the Poles fought on the French side because Napoleonic France was the only warrant to the existence of the Duchy of Warsaw and Napoleon promised to eventually help resurrect Poland, but their hearts were on the Spaniard's side. This excruciating dilemma and fate of the Legiony Polskie has been the subject of poetry as well as fierce discussions in many Polish books and publications since the beginning of 19th century.

== In popular culture ==
The siege was portrayed in the 1950 Spanish film Agustina of Aragon.

== See also ==
- Timeline of the Peninsular War

== Further read ==
- Aquillué, Daniel (2021). Guerra y cuchillo: Los sitios de Zaragoza. 1808-1809.

Preceded by Battle of Cabezón	Napoleonic Wars; First siege of Zaragoza	Succeeded by Battle of Valencia (1808)
