= Puerta del Carmen =

Gate of Carmen
- Puerta del Carmen (Spanish)
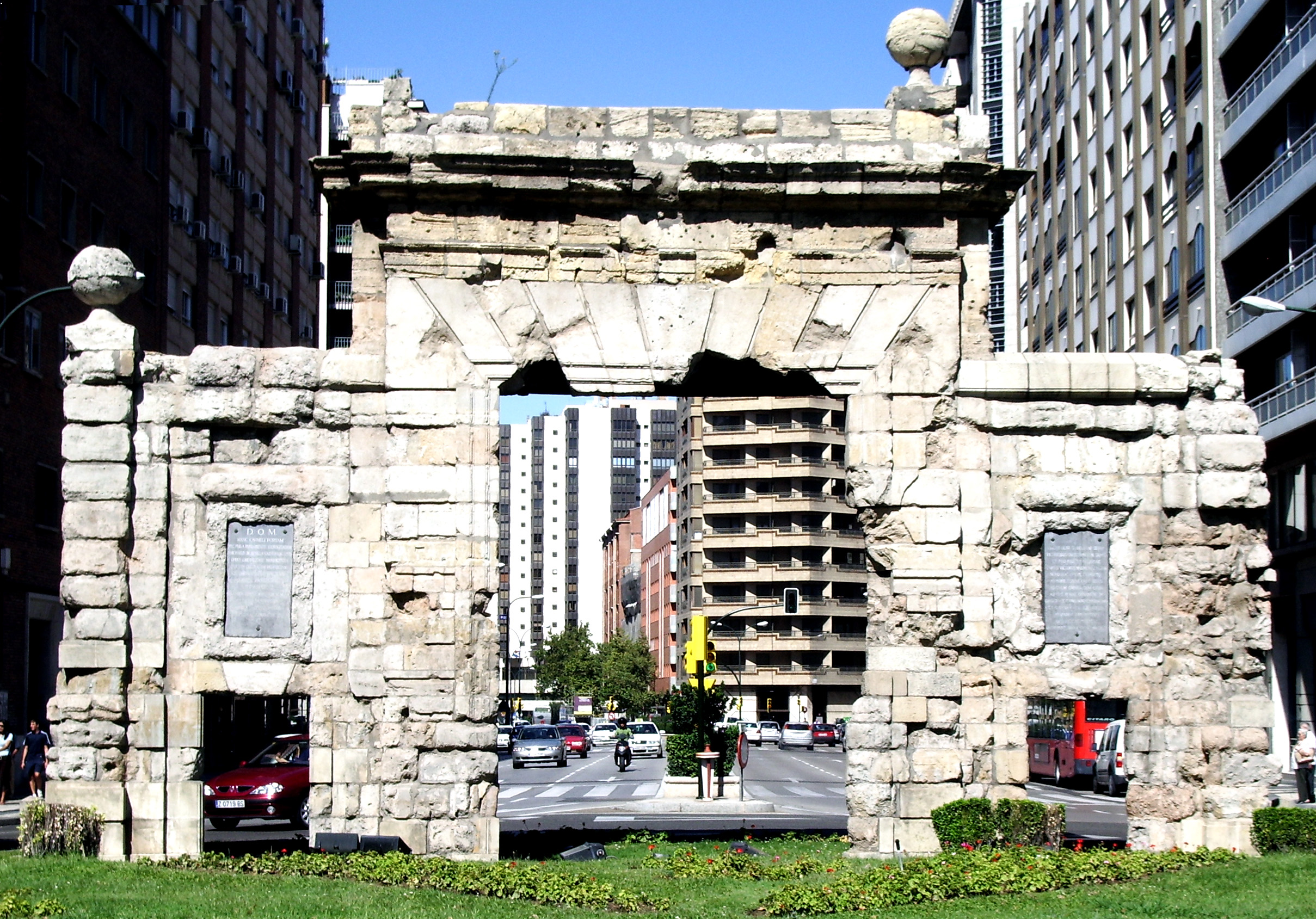

- Location within Spain
- 41.649833°N 0.887581°W
- Location: Zaragoza, Spain

Spanish Cultural Heritage
- Official name: Puerta del Carmen
- Type: Non-movable
- Criteria: Monument
- Designated: 1908
- Reference no.: RI-51-0000094

The Gate of Carmen (Spanish: Puerta del Carmen) is a gate located in Zaragoza, Spain. It was declared Bien de Interés Cultural in 1908.

== See also ==
- List of Bien de Interés Cultural in the Province of Zaragoza
