= José de Palafox, 1st Duke of Zaragoza =

Spanish Army officer and nobleman (1775–1847)

The Most Excellent The Duke of Zaragoza GE
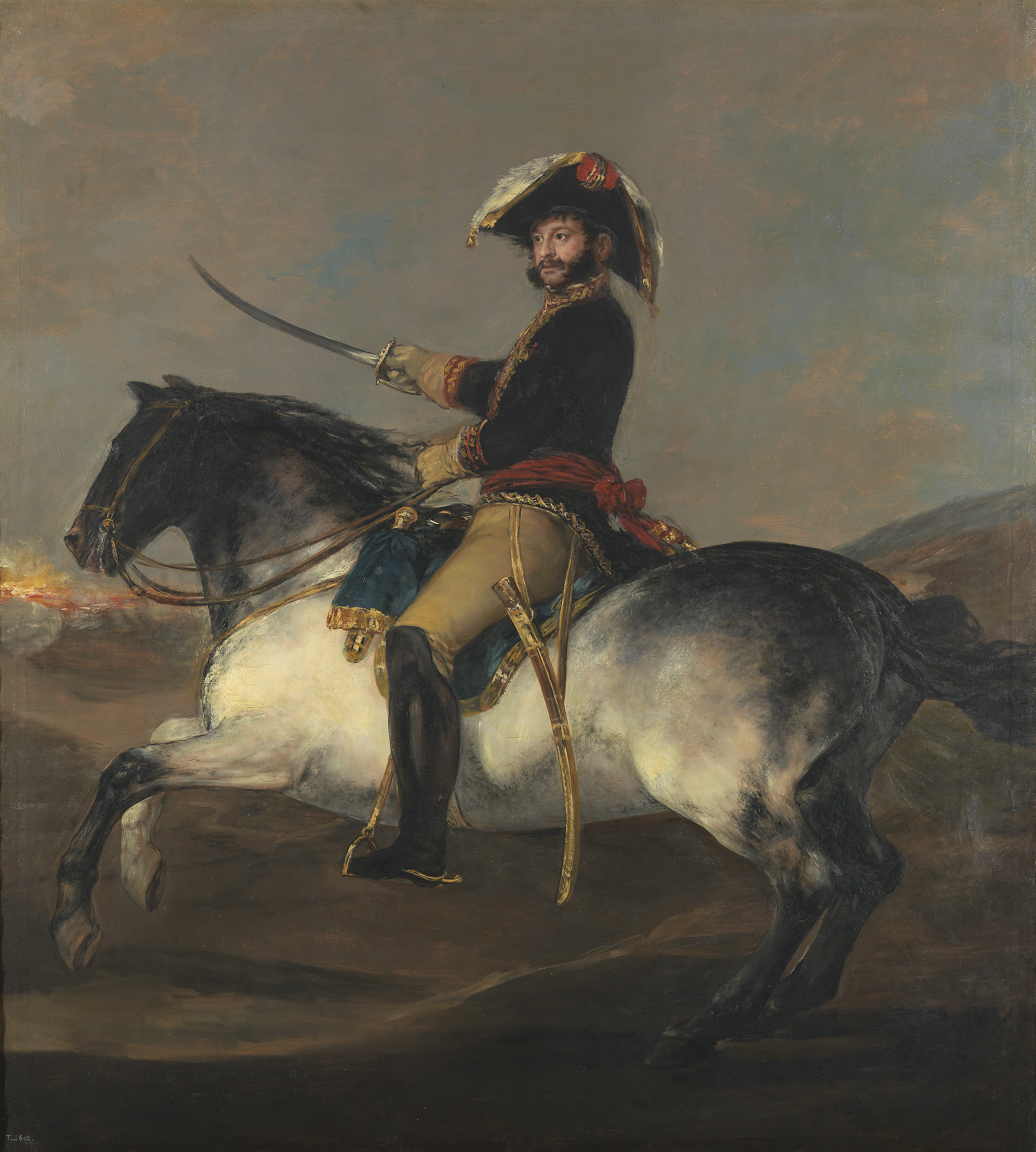
- Portrait by Francisco de Goya

Captain general of the Army
- In office 1809–1847
- Monarch: Fernando VII

Personal details
- Born: José Rebolledo de Palafox y Melci; 28 October 1775 Zaragoza, Spain
- Died: 15 February 1847 (aged 71) Madrid, Spain

Military service
- Allegiance: Kingdom of Spain
- Rank: Captain general
- Commands: Spanish Army
- Battles/wars: Peninsular War

José Rebolledo de Palafox y Melzi, 1st Duke of Zaragoza (28 October 1775 – 15 February 1847) was a Spanish Army officer and nobleman who served in the Peninsular War. He received his title of Duke for successfully repelling the First Siege of Zaragoza by the French. Marshal Jean Lannes conducted the successful Second Siege of Zaragoza.

== Early life ==
He was born in Zaragoza, Aragon, into an old Aragonese family. Palafox was born to Juan Felipe Rebolledo de Palafox and doña Paula Melzi d'Eril and educated at the St. Thomas Aquinas College of the Pious Schools of Zaragoza.

Brought up at the Spanish court, he entered the guards at an early age, and in 1808 as a sub-lieutenant accompanied King Ferdinand VII of Spain to Bayonne; but after vainly attempting, in company with others, to secure Ferdinand's escape, he fled to Spain, and after a short period of retirement placed himself at the head of the patriot movement in Aragon. He was proclaimed by the populace governor of Zaragoza and captain-general of Aragon (25 May 1808) at the beginning of the Peninsular War. Despite the want of money and of regular troops, he lost no time in declaring war against the French, who had already overrun the neighboring provinces of Catalonia and Navarre.

== Zaragoza ==
In Zaragoza, Palafox built a gunpowder and small arms factory, created a corps of sappers and brought 30,000 men under arms. Soon afterward the attack he had provoked began under French general Charles Lefebvre. Zaragoza as a fortress was both antiquated in design and scantily provided with munitions and supplies, and the defenses resisted but a short time. But it was at that point that the real resistance began. A week's street fighting made the assailants masters of half the town, but Palafox's older brother, the Marquis of Lazán, succeeded in forcing a passage into the city with 3,000 troops. Stimulated by the appeals of Palafox and of the fierce and resolute demagogues who ruled the mob, the inhabitants resolved to contest possession of the remaining quarters of Zaragoza inch by inch, and if necessary to retire to the suburb across the Ebro, destroying the bridge. The struggle, which was prolonged for nine days longer, resulted in the withdrawal of the French (14 August), after a siege which had lasted 61 days in all.

Palafox then attempted a short campaign in the open country, but when Napoleon's own army entered Spain, and scattered one Spanish army after another in a few weeks, Palafox was forced back into Zaragoza, where he sustained a still more memorable second siege. This ended, after three months, in the fall of the town, or rather the cessation of resistance, for the town was in ruins and a pestilence had swept away many thousands of the defenders. Palafox himself, suffering from the epidemic, fell into the hands of the French and was kept prisoner at Vincennes until December 1813.

== Domestic politics ==
In June 1814 he was confirmed in the office of Captain General of Aragon, but soon afterwards withdrew from it, and ceased to take part in public affairs. From 1820 to 1823 he commanded the royal guard of King Ferdinand, but, taking the side of the Constitution in the civil troubles which followed, he was stripped of all his honors and offices by the king, whose restoration by French bayonets was the triumph of reaction and absolutism. Palafox remained in retirement for many years. He received the title of Duke of Zaragoza in 1834 from Queen Maria Christine. From 1836 he took part in military and political affairs as captain-general of Aragon and a senator.

He died at Madrid on 15 February 1847.

Spanish nobility
Preceded by New creation	Duke of Zaragoza; 1834–1847	Succeeded by Francisco Rebolledo de Palafox
