= Siege of Zaragoza (1809) =

1808–1809 siege of the Peninsular War

Second siege of Zaragoza
- Part of the Peninsular War
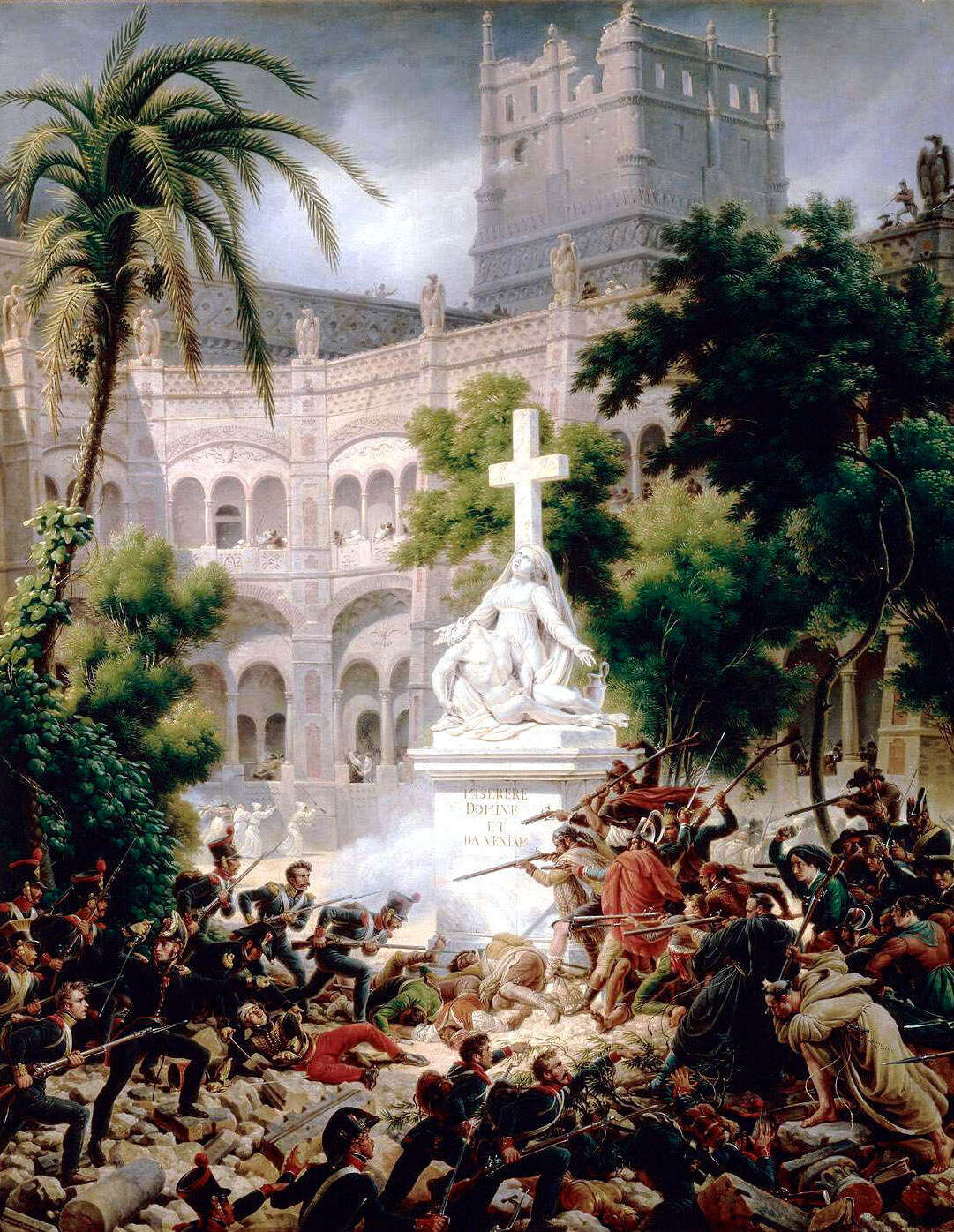
- French troops assaulting the Abbey of Santa Engracia on 8 February during the siege
Date	19 December 1808 – 20 February 1809
Location	Zaragoza, Spain 41.6500°N 0.8833°W
Result	French victory

Belligerents
France; (Poland) Duchy of Warsaw	Spain

Commanders and leaders
(First French Empire) Jean Lannes; (First French Empire) Édouard Mortier; (First French Empire) Louis-Gabriel Suchet; (First French Empire) Jeannot de Moncey	José de Palafox; (Spain) Juan O'Neylle; Felipe de Marcq

Strength
42,000 regulars 3,500 cavalry 4,500 gunners 50 heavy guns	30,000 regulars and militia 1,400 cavalry 150 guns 20,000 Spanish civilians

Casualties and losses
6,000 dead or wounded in combat 6,000 died of disease	30,000 military 34,000 civilians dead

Peninsular War: Napoleon's invasion
current battle

The siege of Zaragoza was the French capture of the Spanish city of Zaragoza in 1809 during the Peninsular War. It was particularly noted for its brutality. The city was heavily outnumbered against the French. Afterwards, a great part of the city lay in ruins, and the garrison had suffered 24,000 deaths along with 30,000 civilians deaths.

== Background ==
The Spanish campaign in early 1809 started with the Battle of Uclés. As a part of the Dos de Mayo Uprising on 2 May the city had already successfully resisted a first siege from 15 June 1808 to 14 August 1808. This was one of the first times in history that a regular army was defeated by irregulars in street fighting. Further defeats – especially the surrender of Divisional-general Pierre Dupont de l'Étang at the Battle of Bailén – forced King Joseph Bonaparte to withdraw behind the Ebro river, abandoning most of Spain except a small corner in the north-east and a small area around Barcelona.

The Spanish at this point missed their best chance to defeat the French. They did not appoint a Supreme Commander, so all the armies continued to operate independently. The main armies consisted of those of General Joaquín Blake y Joyes on the north coast, General Francisco Javier Castaños around Tudela and José Rebolledo de Palafox around Zaragoza. Blake was the most active, but he was defeated at Zornoza on 31 October 1808. Napoleon's plan was to attack in strength towards Burgos in between the armies of Blake and Castaños. Once they broke through they were to swing both north and south to envelope the remaining armies. In order to achieve this, Napoleon wanted the exposed Spanish armies to remain in their current advanced positions. To achieve this Marshal Moncey's 3rd Corps opposite Castaños remained inactive from late October to 21 November while Ney's 4th Corps tried to get to his rear through Burgos and Soria. On 21 November 1808, the French 3rd Corps crossed the Ebro River at Logroño and headed east towards Calahorra. Marshal Ney's column reached the Upper Douro valley and headed for Tudela.

To avoid being trapped, Castaños withdrew to Tudela and asked Palafox to help him hold a line running South of the city towards Cascante, where he intended to confront Moncey's Corps before the arrival of Ney's 4th Corps. Palafox's deputy in the area, General O'Neylle demurred stating that he had strict orders not to cross the borders of Aragon (Tudela is located in Navarre). When Palafox's approval arrived, the French attack had already begun and got the Spanish in disarray. This battle was a major victory for the French, but the Spanish armies were able to flee, O'Neylle to Zaragoza and Castaños to Madrid, escaping with the large majority of their war chests and cannons. The stage was now set for a second siege.

== Prelude ==
Considerable changes occurred in the defences of Zaragoza after the first siege. In that siege, the city had few fortifications, except for the medieval walls that could not withstand the French artillery bombardment. The defenders consisted of only a handful of regular troops and gunners, plus a mass of thousands of volunteers. They had, however, been able to inflict heavy casualties on the French at the barricades in the narrow winding streets. Since September 1808, Colonel Sangenís had been working on a number of modern fortifications. To the south, the city was protected by the Huerva River, which Sangenís used as a moat with two redoubts on the south side of the river: "Our lady of the Pillar" in the south-west corner and the San Jose convent on the south-east corner. These were overlooked by the city walls.

To the west, a solid rampart had been built outside the city walls, incorporating the Augustinian and Trinitarian convents. This provided a central gun battery, as well as a ditch that was 14 metres deep. San Lazaro was fortified with a rampart protected by waterways and the two convents on the north side of the Ebro River had been made into fortresses. On the key position of Monte Torrero, Sangenís built an entrenched military camp using the Aragon Canal as a moat. Progress on the fortifications had been slow until the Battle of Tudela. After that, it was clear the French could attack at any moment and suddenly 60,000 volunteers were available. If the French had attacked quickly, then even this would not have helped. Due to the delay, however, the Spanish had time to improve the fortifications and obtain sufficient supplies.

Inside the walls, the strong, almost entirely inflammable masonry homes and apartment buildings were laced together with internal passageways, making each block of the city its own barricaded fortress, with the numerous church buildings standing as keeps and strong-points, from which grapeshot and counter-battery fire could command the streets. The garrison would also be much stronger than in the first siege. Palafox had raised an additional 10–12,000 new recruits in Zaragoza plus a further 17,000 survivors of the Battle of Tudela. By the start of the siege Palafox had 32,000 infantry, 2,000 cavalry and 10,000 armed volunteers. To prevent the danger of magazine explosions, the city manufactured its gunpowder as it was needed. Supplies of food and ammunition were sufficient for three months plus private stocks held by townspeople.

The Battle of Tudela was over on 23 November 1808 but the siege of Zaragoza did not commence until 20 December 1808. This allowed the Spanish sufficient time to build up the defences and to lay in supplies. After the Battle of Tudela two corps had been available to attack Zaragoza – the 3rd corps under Marshal Moncey and the 6th Corps under Marshal Ney. Both of these corps left Tudela on 28 November and arrived at Zaragoza on 30 November. They were about to commence the siege when Marshall Ney was ordered to take his army across the mountains to New Castille where he was to prevent the army of Castaños, retreating from Tudela, from interfering with his movements towards Madrid. There were now only 15,000 men under Moncey facing Zaragoza which was insufficient for a siege. As a result, Moncey retired to Tudela to await reinforcements from Marshal Mortier with his 5th Corps. These troops arrived from Germany on 15 December giving a total of 38,000 infantry, 3,500 cavalry, 3,000 engineers, and 60 siege guns to attack Zaragoza.

== Siege ==
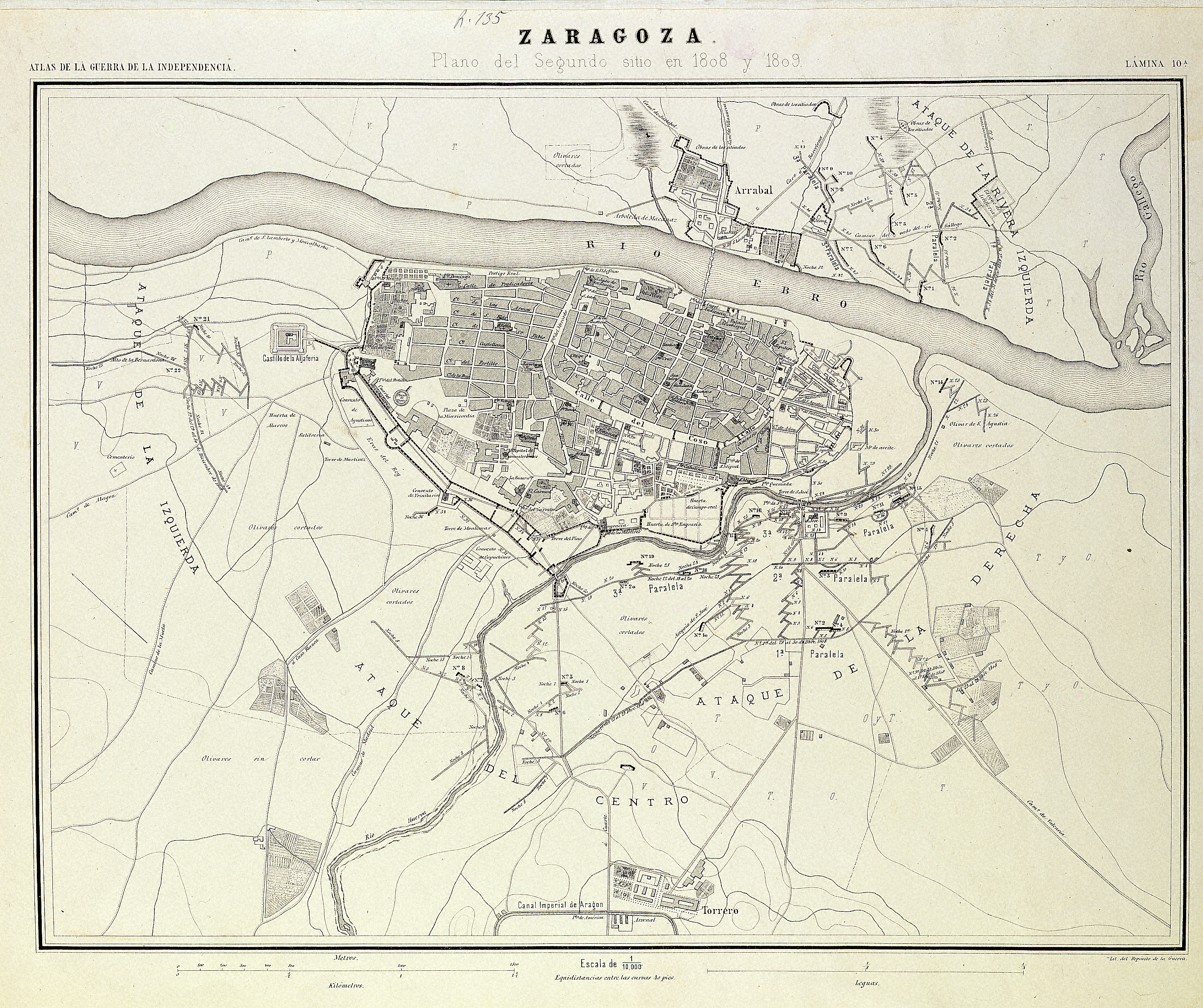
1868 map of the siege

On 20 December the French forces arrived again at Zaragoza. Moncey split his forces: One division under General Gazan was assigned to the north, Mortier's corps was posted to the west, and Moncey's corps went to the south. The first key objective was the weak Spanish outworks on Monte Torrero. On 21 December 1808, three batteries began bombarding these positions followed by an attack by twenty battalions of infantry which successfully drove the Spanish out of these positions. This initial success was to prove decisive as once again the French were able to deploy their main gun batteries on Monte Torrero and were ultimately successful in breaching the southern wall. Gazan launched an attack on the same day against San Lazaro, however, this attack was unsuccessful due to the strength of the Spanish defence.

On 22 December 1808 Moncey formally demanded the surrender of the city but this was refused. Moncey then decided to concentrate his efforts on the southern side of the city and prepared attacks against the Pillar redoubt and against the San Jose convent. Preparations were also made for an attack opposite the castle of Aljafería in the north-west. On 29 December 1808 Moncey was reassigned to Madrid and was replaced in command of the 3rd corps by General Jean-Andoche Junot. Mortier was then the senior officer however he worked in partnership with Junot until he was himself reassigned on 2 January 1809.

The French preparations were finally complete on 10 January 1809 and they commenced bombarding the Pillar Redoubt and San Jose. By the end of the day, the San Jose walls were about to collapse. Palafox counter-attacked the French guns at 1 am on 11 January 1808 but this attack failed and the Spanish troops withdrew into the city. The French attack on the Pillar Redoubt continued until the night of 15–16 January 1808 when the 1st Polish Vistula Regiment stormed the position. The Spanish had already left destroying the bridge across the Huerva river at the same time. On 16 January 1809 the main Spanish outworks were in French hands. The French armies could now concentrate on breaching the walls of Zaragoza. From 17 January 1809 the French began a bombardment of the walls from the San Jose redoubt. Palafox knew the walls would not last long and prepared barricades in the city, turning it into a maze of small forts. In January Junot was replaced with General Jean Lannes who had been recovering from an earlier injury. Sickness was now creating problems on both sides. On the French side there were now only 20,000 fit infantry. At the same time new Spanish forces were being created near the city under Francisco Palafox (younger brother of the General) and the Marquis of Lazan (older brother of the General).

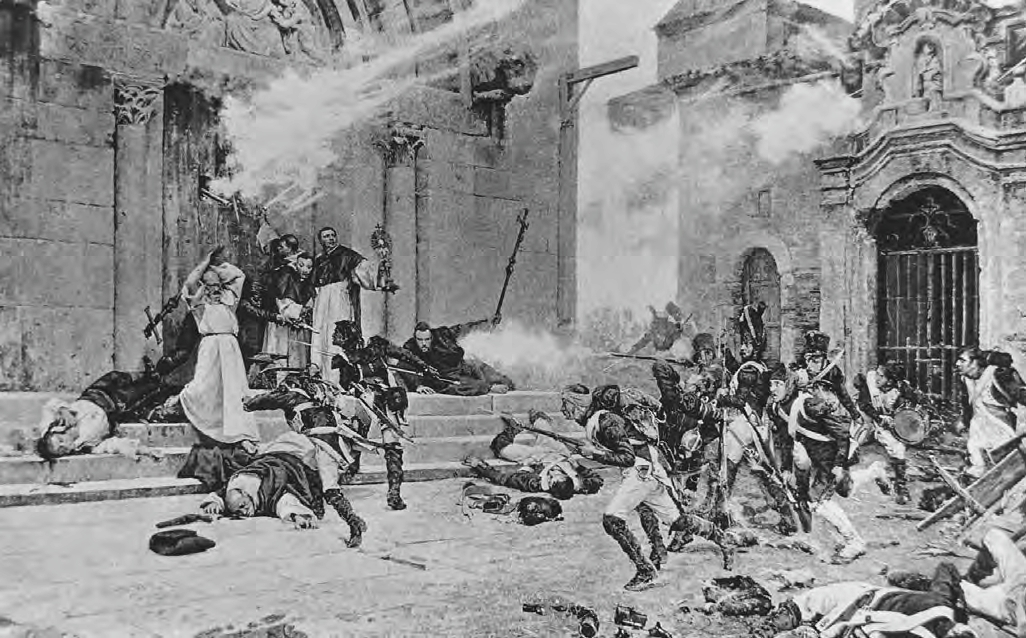
French troops assaulting a church during the siege

Lannes was concerned about his rear and recalled Mortier's division which had been protecting the lines of communication between Madrid and Zaragoza. On 26 January Mortier's army defeated a peasant militia of some 4–5 thousands men at Alcañiz. The French attack commenced on 24 January 1809 when three beachheads were captured across the Huerva river. The main assault began on 27 January 1809 through three breaches in the city walls. Lannes broke through two breaches and captured the battery at the south-eastern corner and also the convent of Santa Engracia in the south-west. The Spanish defenders had been preparing for street fighting from the beginning. Lannes, however, had decided on a slow block-by-block siege of each individual fortification in order to minimise French casualties. Individual battles were remarkable for their ferocity. At one point in the San Augustin Convent, the French held the altar end of the chapel and exchanged shots for hours on end with the Spanish entrenched in the nave and the belfry. However, French superiority in equipment and training took its toll, and thousands were falling daily both in the fighting and to disease, which was rampant throughout the city.

By February illness was decimating the population of Zaragoza and only 8,495 men remained of the original garrison of 32,000 men. There were 10,000 dead and 13,737 sick or wounded. The French were unaware of this however and morale was low due to the apparent never-ending battle in the narrow streets. Disappointed with the slow progress, Lannes ordered the troops north of the river to make a second attack on San Lazaro and on 18 February 1809 this attack was successful. The northern part of Zaragoza could now be attacked with artillery. By 19 February 1809 the Spanish defence was failing and Palafox himself was seriously ill. He sent his aide to Lannes to discuss terms of surrender. He then resigned his military command in favour of General St. March, and his civil command of the city to a 33-member council of local citizens. The first offer of surrender was rejected and fighting resumed on 20 February 1809 but the civilian council quickly negotiated to end the fighting which ceased that evening. Most of the city lay in ruins, and around 54,000 people had perished in the siege.

== Aftermath ==
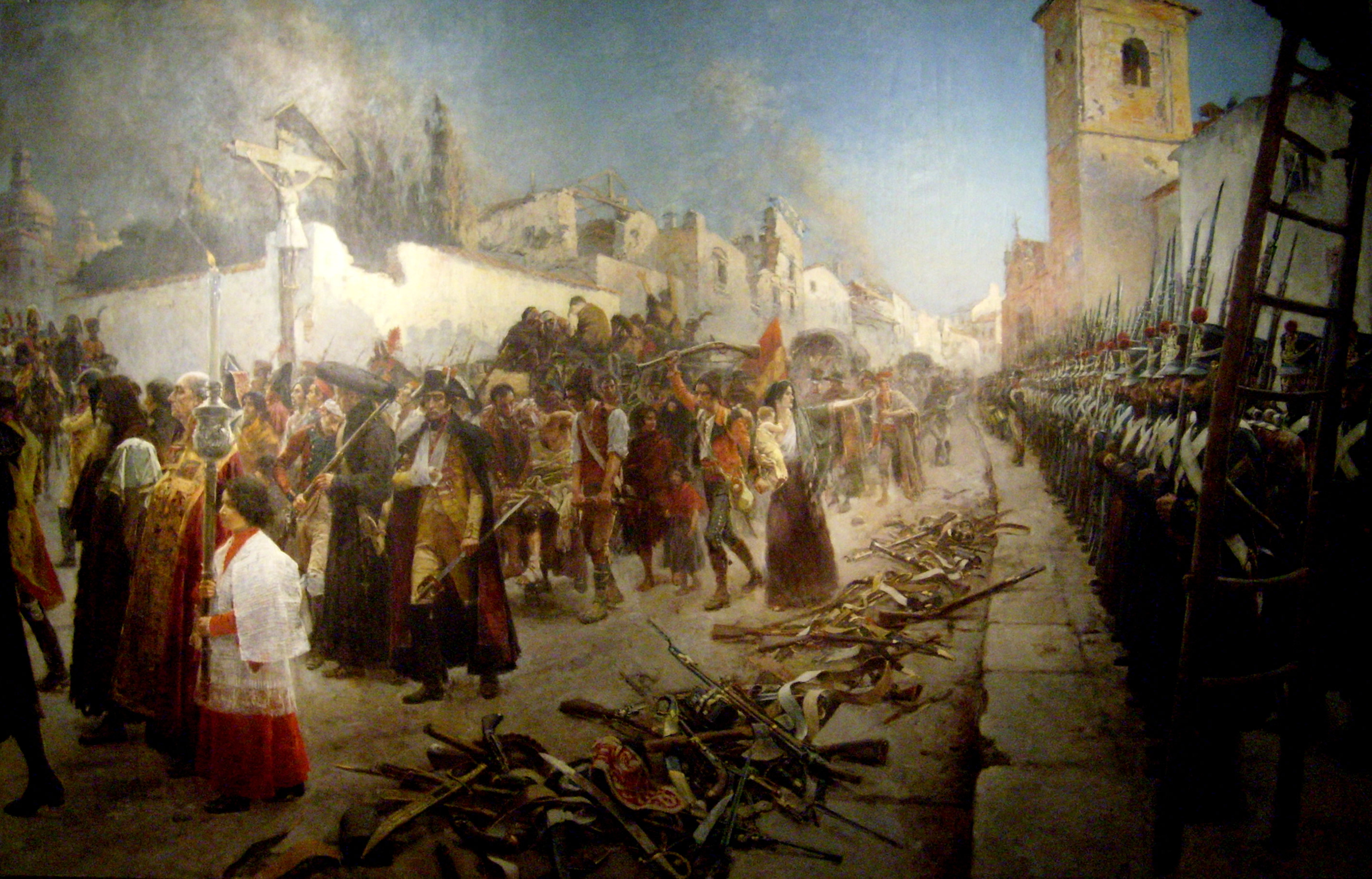
Spanish soldiers and civilians leaving Zaragoza after the siege

Under the terms of surrender the garrison marched out of the city and stacked their arms outside the Portillo gate. They had the choice of going into captivity or joining the French army. Of the 32,000 men at the start of the siege only 8,000 survived. The terms of surrender allowed private property to be respected and a general amnesty was granted to the city. Although some looting took place the city was not sacked.

The suffering of the city had been terrible with estimated deaths of 54,000 made up of 20,000 soldiers and 34,000 civilians. Lannes himself estimated that the population of Zaragoza had fallen from 55,500 to 15,000. The city considered the Florence of Spain was completely destroyed, losing many emblematic buildings like Abbey of Santa Engracia or the houses of the kingdom, the government headquarters of the medieval era. The French had also suffered losing about 10,000 men – 4,000 in battle and the rest to sickness. Palafox himself was harshly treated by the French who imprisoned him as a traitor at Vincennes.

== See also ==
- Manuela Sancho
- Timeline of the Peninsular War

== Bibliography ==
- Bodart, Gaston (1908). Militär-historisches Kriegs-Lexikon (1618–1905).
- Esdaile, Charles J. (2003). The Peninsular War. Palgrave MacMillan. ISBN 9781403962317.
- Haythornthwaite, Philip J. (1996). Die Hard! Famous Napoleonic Battles. London: Cassell.
- MacDonell, A. (2015). Napoleon and his marshals. CreateSpace Independent Publishing Platform. ISBN 978-1516853144.
- Rudorff, Raymond (1974). War to the Death: The Sieges of Saragossa 1808-1809. Hamish Hamilton. ISBN 978-0-241-02449-2.
- georgian (2017). "Napoleonic Wars in the Iberian Peninsula: Battles in Spain during 1809". Archived from the original on 25 September 2017.
- militari (2020). "De Re Militari" (in Spanish). Archived from the original on 6 October 2020.
- Rickard (2008). "Second Siege of Saragossa, 20 December 1808–20 February 1809". Archived from the original on 21 December 2019.
- Weider (2009). "Napoleon's Total War". Archived from the original on 6 October 2009.

Preceded by Battle of Somosierra	Napoleonic Wars; Second siege of Zaragoza	Succeeded by Battle of Sahagún
