= Timeline of the Peninsular War =

Peninsular War
- Part of Napoleonic Wars
- Movements of the French troops in Spain during the first stages (1808–1811) of the Peninsular War (key in Spanish)
Location
- Iberian Peninsula (mainly)
- France
- Balearic Islands

The following tables show the sequence of events of the Peninsular War (1807–1814), including major battles, smaller actions, uprisings, sieges and other related events that took place during that period. (Note: Also included are naval actions which had a direct effect on the development of the events on the Iberian Peninsula. However, unless they can be directly ascribed to the Peninsular War, those actions which took place in the vicinity, such as the blockade of French ports in the Bay of Biscay, for instance, the actions of November 1808 or April 1809, however much they affected Napoleon's plans on the Peninsula, are excluded as they were possibly more related to the general war efforts of the time.)

For ease of reference using modern maps, the provinces/regions given for Spain and Portugal are those that correspond to the 20th century. (Note: That is, resulting from the 1976 Constitution of Portugal and the processes of devolution of Spain's transition to democracy (1979). As regards the latter, seventeen autonomous communities (regions) and two autonomous cities were created. This affects, in particular, the historical regions and provinces of León and Old Castile (Spanish: Castilla la Vieja), constituted in 1983 as Castile and León.) Events in Portugal and France are specified.

== Overview ==
The Peninsular War was a military conflict for control of the Iberian Peninsula during the Napoleonic Wars, waged between France and the allied powers of Spain, the United Kingdom and Portugal. It started when French and Spanish armies, then allied, occupied Portugal in 1807, and escalated in 1808 when France turned on Spain, its former ally. The war on the peninsula lasted until the Sixth Coalition defeated Napoleon in 1814, and is regarded as one of the first wars of national liberation, and significant for the emergence of large-scale guerrilla warfare. British and Portuguese forces eventually secured Portugal, using it as a safe position from which to launch campaigns against the French army, while both Spanish and Portuguese guerrillas weakened the occupying forces.

The Peninsular War overlaps with what the Spanish-speaking world calls the Guerra de la Independencia Española (Spanish War of Independence), which began with the Dos de Mayo Uprising on 2 May 1808 and ended on 17 April 1814. Although Spain had been in upheaval since at least the Mutiny of Aranjuez (March 1808), May 1808 marks the start of the Spanish War of Independence. The French occupation destroyed the Spanish administration, which fragmented into quarrelling provincial juntas. In 1810, a reconstituted national government, the Cortes of Cádiz—effectively a government-in-exile—fortified itself in Cádiz but could not raise effective armies because it was besieged by up to 70,000 French troops. Cádiz would go on to hold the distinction of being the only city in continental Europe to survive a siege by Napoleon: thirty-one months—from 5 February 1810 to 25 August 1812. The combined efforts of regular and irregular forces throughout the peninsula prevented Napoleon's marshals from subduing the rebellious Spanish provinces, and the war continued through years of stalemate.

While the initial stages of the Peninsular War were fought on Portuguese soil, most of the war was fought on Spanish soil and, as the French army was pushed further back across the Pyrenees, the final stages of the war were fought on French soil.

== List of events ==
=== 1807 ===
Date	Event	Province/region (modern)	Outcome	Notes
12–18 October 1807	French troops enter Spain en route to Portugal	Irun, Basque Country	Manoeuvres (French)	Junot crosses into Spain at Irun with the 25,000–28,000 troops of the Corps of Observation of the Gironde. The Treaty of Fontainebleau, to be signed later that month, stipulates that three columns of Spanish troops numbering 25,500 men will support the Invasion of Portugal.
27 October 1807	Treaty of Fontainebleau signed by Charles IV of Spain and Napoleon I of France	Fontainebleau	Treaty	The accord proposed the division of the Kingdom of Portugal and all Portuguese dominions between the signatories.
12 November 1807	Junot's Army of the Gironde reaches Salamanca	Salamanca, Castile and León	Manoeuvres (French)	
19–30 November 1807	Invasion of Portugal	Portugal	Manoeuvres (French)	Junot enters Portugal 19 November, moving west from Alcántara along the Tagus valley to Portugal, a distance of only 120 miles (193 km).
22 November 1807	Dupont's Second Corps of Observation of the Gironde crosses into Spain	Bayonne to Spain	Manoeuvres (French)	The 25,000 men of the French reserves, the Second Corps of Observation of the Gironde, under General Dupont, crossed into Spain. The following month, when Marshal Moncey's troops also crossed the Pyrenees (see 8 January 1808, below), Dupont marched on towards Madrid, cantoning in Burgos, Valladolid, and other major cities of Old Castile.
29 November 1807	Transfer of the Portuguese Court to Brazil			The Royal Court of Portugal, headed by the Prince Regent, Prince John and his mother, Maria I of Portugal, set sail for Brazil, escorted by the British Royal Navy, led by Sir Sidney Smith and Sir Graham Moore (younger brother of Sir John Moore).
30 November 1807	Junot occupies Lisbon	Lisbon	Manoeuvres (French)	Junot entered the city with only 1,500 troops; the rest of his troops arriving over the following ten days.
1 December 1807	First anti-French riots	Lisbon		
13 December 1807	Anti-French riots	Lisbon		Junot ordered the Portuguese flag be replaced by the tricolour on the public buildings in the city, which led to a fierce riot, dispersed with a cavalry charge.

=== 1808 ===
Date	Event	Province/region (modern)	Outcome	Notes
8 January 1808	Bayonne – Spain		Manoeuvres (French)	Following General Dupont's entry into Spain the previous month (see 22 November 1807, above), a third army corps, Marshal Moncey's 30,000-strong Corps of Observation of the Ocean Coast, crossed the border via Bayonne, occupying all the major towns of Biscay and Navarre.
February 1808	Junot dissolves the Regency Council and disbands the Portuguese army.		Manoeuvres (French)	The Portuguese Legion, comprising 6,000 Portuguese soldiers, sent to France.
10 February 1808	French troops enter Catalonia	Barcelona, Catalonia	Manoeuvre (French)	General Duhesme, at the head of 14,000 troops, half French, half Italians, enters Catalonia and moves towards Barcelona.
16 February 1808	Citadel of Pamplona (Capture of)	Pamplona, Navarre	Manoeuvres (French)	The French troops quartered in the town surprised the Spanish garrison at the Citadel. Oman (1902) refers to this coup de main, the first of a series of similar actions, as the "infamous seizure by surprise of the Spanish frontier fortresses, which would pass for the most odious act of the Emperor's whole career, if the kidnapping at Bayonne were not to follow".
29 February 1808	Citadel of Barcelona (Capture of)	Barcelona, Catalonia	Manoeuvres (French)	General Lecchi, commanding the French troops passing through Barcelona, marched his division through the city to the gate of the citadel and suddenly entered the fortress, before the Spanish garrison realised what was happening and, without a fight, evicted the Spanish troops.
5 March 1808	Fortress of San Sebastian (Capture of)	San Sebastian	Manoeuvres (French)	One of Spain's frontier fortresses, this one at the Atlantic end of the Pyrenees, was surrendered when orders from Madrid forbade its governor to resist an assault.
10 March 1808	Joachim Murat crosses into Spain from Bayonne		Manoeuvres (French)	Napoleon's brother-in-law, the new Grand-Duke of Berg, as 'Lieutenant of the Emperor', was to take command of all the French forces in Spain.
17–19 March 1808	Mutiny of Aranjuez	Aranjuez, Madrid		Ferdinand, Prince of the Asturias, announced that the King was displeased with Godoy, the Prince of the Peace, and had determined to dismiss him. The following morning, a royal decree was issued, declaring Godoy relieved of all his posts and duties and banished from the court.
18 March 1808	Sant Ferran Castle (Capture of)	Figueres, Catalonia	Manoeuvres (French)	The citadel at Figueres, on the Mediterranean coast, yet another of Spain's frontier fortresses, was seized by a coup de main similar to the one carried out a month earlier at Pamplona. (See 16 February 1808, above.)
18 March 1808	Joachim Murat	Burgos	Manoeuvres (French)	With the arrival at Burgos of Napoleon's brother-in-law, Murat, newly appointed Lieutenant of the Emperor, and commissioned to take command of all the French forces in Spain, together with the news that more than 30,000 troops, under Marshal Bessières, had already started to cross the Pyrenees, bringing up the total of French troops on the Peninsula to more than 100,000 men, Godoy ordered the departure of the King for Seville.
19 March 1808	Charles IV of Spain abdicates	Aranjuez, Madrid	Abdication	Charles IV of Spain abdicated in favour of his son, Ferdinand VII
23 March 1808	Murat enters Madrid	Madrid	Manoeuvres (French)	In his letter to his brother Louis, dated 27 March 1808, offering him the throne of Spain, Napoleon stated that he had 100,000 troops in Spain, and that 40,000 of them had entered Madrid with Murat on 23 March 1808.
24 March 1808	Ferdinand VII enters Madrid	Madrid	Manoeuvres (French)	
2 May 1808	Dos de Mayo Uprising	Madrid	Uprising: French victory	Following the fighting at the Royal Palace, rebellion spread to other parts of the city, with street fighting in different areas including heavy fighting around the Puerta del Sol, the Puerta de Toledo and at the Monteleón barracks. Martial law was imposed on the city. Hundreds of people died in the fighting, including around 150 French soldiers. The uprising was depicted by the Spanish artist Goya in The Second of May 1808 (The Charge of the Mamelukes) and The Third of May 1808.
6 May 1808	Ferdinand VII abdicates	Bayonne	Abdication	Abdications of Bayonne.
9 May 1808	Uprising in Oviedo	Oviedo, Asturias	Uprising	On 13 May, the president of the Junta of Asturias, the Marquis of Santa Cruz, declared that "when and wherever one single Spaniard took arms against Napoleon, he would shoulder a musket and put himself at that man's side". On 24 May, the Marquis of Campo Sagrado was appointed lieutenant general.
23 May 1808	Uprising in Valencia	Valencia	Uprising	Valencia acknowledges Fernando as King of Spain. The governor, Miguel de Saavedra, Baron Albalat, is killed by the crowds. Bertrán de Lis and his brothers arm the population. The captain-general, Marquis of the Conquista is deposed and substituted by the Count of Cervellón.
24 May 1808	Uprising in Zaragoza	Zaragoza	Uprising	Captain general Guillelmi is imprisoned and Palafox appointed captain general in his place (26 May).
24 May 1808	Uprising in Murcia	Murcia	Uprising	Floridablanca appointed president of the newly formed local junta. González Llamas promoted to lieutenant general. The captain general of Cartagena, Francisco de Borja, assassinated.
24 May 1808 – 5 June 1808	Dupont marches from Toledo	Toledo – Andújar, Andalusia	Manoeuvres (French)	After having originally received orders from Murat to head for Cádiz, which were countermanded by Napoleon, thinking that his troops might be needed in Madrid, Dupont finally left Toledo with 13,000 second-line troops. After crossing Sierra Morena and encountering no hostility along the way, he occupied Andujar on 5 June.
26 May 1808	Uprising in Seville	Seville	Uprising	Francisco de Saavedra appointed president of the newly formed local junta.
27 May 1808	Uprising in Santander	Santander	Uprising	Juan Manuel Velarde appointed captain general and the Bishop of Santander appointed president of the local junta.
29 May 1808	Uprising in Cádiz	Cádiz	Uprising	The captain general, Solano, assassinated. Tomás de Morla appointed captain general.
30 May 1808	Uprisings in Corunna and Ferrol	Galicia	Uprising	Taking over from the then acting captain-general of Galicia, Biedma, Filangieri was appointed president of the newly formed local junta at Corunna, but assassinated the following month. Joaquín Blake promoted to lieutenant general.
30 May 1808	Uprising in Extremadura	Extremadura	Uprising	The captain general, the Count of Torre del Fresno, assassinated. Galluzo promoted to lieutenant general.
30 May 1808	Uprising in Granada	Granada	Uprising	The captain general is forced to proclaim himself in favour of Ferdinand VII. A local junta set up, independent from that of Seville.
30 May 1808	Uprising in Balearic Islands	Balearic Islands	Uprising	The captain general, Vives, based at Mallorca, appointed president of the newly formed local junta.
End of May 1808	Uprising in Valladolid	Valladolid	Uprising	Riots led to the captain general, Cuesta, being forced to lead the rebellion.
Beginning of June 1808	Uprising in Canary Islands	Canary Islands	Uprising	Once news had arrived from Seville, a local junta was set up, Captain general Cagigal was arrested and Carlos O'Donnell appointed captain general in his place.
5 June 1808	Despeñaperros	Jaén, Andalusia	Spanish victory (guerrillas)	Two squadrons of French dragoons were attacked by insurgents at the northern entrance to the pass of Despenaperros, a steep gorge (defile) in the Sierra Morena that separates Castile-La Mancha (including Madrid) from Andalusia. The French were forced to retreat to the nearby town of Almuradiel.
5 June 1808	Uprising of Santa Cruz de Mudela	Ciudad Real, Castile-La Mancha	Uprising: Spanish victory	The 700 French troops stationed in the village of Santa Cruz de Mudela are attacked by the population. After 109 French soldiers were killed and 113 taken prisoner, the rest fled back in the direction of Madrid, to Valdepeñas. (See 6 June 1808, below.)
5–6 June 1808	Valencia (Massacre of)	Valencia	Massacre	Canon (clergy) Baltasar Calvo instigated the massacre of 300–400 French citizens, half of whom were inside the city's citadel, where the local authorities were protecting them against popular reprisals following the killings in Madrid. After having declared himself the only representative of King Ferdinand and was about to issue orders for dismissing the captain-general, Conde de Cervellon, and dissolving the Junta, Calvo was arrested, tried as a traitor and executed. Some two hundred of his followers were also executed and their bodies exposed in public.
6 June 1808	Uprising of Valdepeñas	Ciudad Real, Castile-La Mancha	Uprising: Spanish victory	Following the previous day's uprising in Santa Cruz de Mudela, Liger-Bélair and Roize, at the head of some 800 troops, together with some 300 soldiers that had escaped from the Santa Cruz uprising the previous day, prepare to march through the town of Valdepeñas. The population attack the leading column and Liger-Bélair sends in the dragoons, who are also forced to retreat. The resulting truce stipulates that, in return for a day's worth of food supplies, the French troops will not pass through the village. These actions at Santa Cruz (see 5 June 1808, above) and Valdepeñas, together with more isolated actions in the Sierra Morena, effectively cut French military communications between Madrid and Andalusia for around a month.
6 June 1808	Porto (Uprising of)	Porto (Portugal)	Uprising: Portuguese victory	On hearing of the rebellion in Spain, Spanish general Belesta, having participated in the Invasion of Portugal, and stationed at Porto with 6,000 Spanish troops, captures the French general Quesnel, and marches to Coruña to join the fight against the French troops, sparking off a series of uprisings throughout the north of Portugal.
6 June 1808	Coronation of Joseph I	Madrid		Napoleon's elder brother, Joseph Bonaparte, proclaimed King of Spain. His reign lasted until 11 December 1813, when he abdicated and returned to France after the French defeat at the Battle of Vitoria in 1813.
6 June 1808	First battle of Bruch	El Bruc, Barcelona, Catalonia	Spanish victory	See also Second battle of Bruch (14 June 1808), below. Often grouped together as one battle, there were in fact two separate battles, or skirmishes, separated by more than a week, with different armies and commanders involved: of the 12 French regiments that participated, only one of them fought at both battles. Although Schwarz's 3,800 troops had successfully fought off the initial ambush by a smaller Spanish army numbering some 900 men, they did not pursue their advantage and were routed when reinforcements of miquelets and somatenes arrived. The battle saw troops of the Swiss Wimpffen Regiment fighting on both sides, since a detachment had recently deserted the French army to join the Spanish troops.
7 June 1808	Battle of Alcolea Bridge	Córdoba, Andalusia	French victory	At Alcolea, 10 km from Córdoba, Dupont's troops engaged in their first battle in Andalusia against 3,000 regular troops under Pedro Agustín de Echávarri who tried to protect the bridge over the Guadalquivir. The same day, Dupont captured Córdoba.
7 June 1808	Córdoba	Córdoba, Andalusia	French victory/sack	On their way to Seville, and ultimately to Cádiz, Dupont's 18,000 troops capture Córdoba, ransacking the city over four days. However, damaging guerrilla actions force Dupont to withdraw towards Madrid to meet up with Gobert's division, that had set out from Madrid on 2 July to reinforce Dupont. Only one brigade of this division ultimately reached Dupont, the rest being needed to hold the road north (to Madrid) against the guerrillas.
9–10 June 1808	Sack of L'Arboç	L'Arboç, Tarragona, Catalonia	Manoeuvres (French)/sack	On retreating back from Tarragona towards Barcelona, General Chabran's vanguard was attacked and chased away by some 1,200 sometents from El Vendrell and 200 Swiss regulars. When Chabran's emissary returned to negotiate, the villagers met them with gunfire and the French troops retaliated, sacking the village.
9–14 June 1808	Capture of the Rosily Squadron	Cádiz, Andalusia	Spanish victory	
11 June 1808	Arrest of Spanish troops in Portugal	Lisbon, Portugal	Manoeuvres (French)	Following General Belesta's escape from Porto (See 6 June 1808, above), Junot arrested General Carrafa and rounded up most of his 7,000 troops, (Note: The only Spanish troops able to escape the round-up were the 2nd Cavalry regiment, the Queen's Own, whose colonel rode off to Oporto with his two squadrons, and some units of the infantry regiments of Murcia and Valencia, who escaped to Badajoz. (Oman, 1902: pp. 208–209.)) the only Spanish troops now left in Portugal, were disarmed and kept prisoners on pontoons moored under the guns of the Lisbon forts, until the English released them after the battle of Vimiero, ten weeks later, under the terms of the Convention of Cintra.
12 June 1808	Battle of Cabezón	Valladolid, Castile and León	French victory	
14 June 1808	Second battle of Bruch	El Bruc, Barcelona, Catalonia	Spanish victory	See also First battle of Bruch (6 June 1808), above. Following Schwarz's defeat at the First battle of Bruc (see 6 June, above), Duhesme sent Chabran on a punitive operation. Some 1,800 men, with four cannon, under Colonel Juan Baget fought against Chabran's 1st Division, comprising some 5,600 troops. Although they were only really skirmishes, the two actions at Bruc mark the first victories over Napoleon's army in Spain and, as such, were put to good use as Fernandine propaganda.
15 June 1808 – 14 August 1808	First Siege of Zaragoza	Zaragoza, Aragón	Spanish victory	
16 June 1808	Uprising of Olhão	Olhão (Portugal)	Uprising: Portuguese victory	Portuguese civilians revolted and expelled the French forces from Olhão. By 23 June, all French forces had been expelled from the region of Algarve.
17 June 1808	Skirmish of Mongat	Montgat, Barcelona, Catalonia	French victory	On his way to Girona, with four French and three Italian squadrons of cuirassiers and chasseurs, almost the whole of his cavalry, that is, some 5,900 men, nearly half his corps, and a battery of eight guns, Duhesme was met at the Castle of Montgat by some 8,000 or 9,000 somatenes who fled after suffering severe losses.
17 June 1808	Sack of Mataró	Mataró, Barcelona, Catalonia	Manoeuvres (French)/sack	Met with barricades, and two or three cannon, Milosewitz's Italian brigade easily stormed the town, which Duhesme's troops entered that same afternoon, and were given permission by their general to sack the town. After leaving Mataró the following day, the French troops then destroyed every other village on the road to Girona.
18 June 1808	Uprising of Faro	Faro (Portugal)	Uprising: Portuguese victory	On 18 June the civilians in the city of Faro captured 70 French soldiers and General Maurin, the Governor of Algarve. Colonel Maransin, Maurin's second-in-command, having lost his communications with Lisbon, evacuated his 1,200 men, a battalion each of the 26th of the line and the Légion du Midi, from the province. He withdrew first to Mertola and then to Beja, in the Alemtejo, before heading to Lisbon. (See 26 June 1808, below.)
19 June 1808	Vedel marches from Toledo	Toledo – La Carolina	Manoeuvres (French)	Vedel, with the 6,000 men, 700 horse, and 12 guns of the 2nd Division, set out south from Toledo to force a passage over the Sierra Morena, hold the mountains from the guerrillas, and link up with Dupont, pacifying Castile-La Mancha along the way. Vedel was joined during the march by small detachments under Roize and Liger-Bélair.
20–21 June 1808	Battle of Girona	Girona, Catalonia	Spanish victory	
21 June 1808			Manoeuvres (French)/Portuguese victory	Loison, based at Almeida, left for Porto with two battalions, some 2,000 men, and a few guns to garrison that city. Crossing the Douro at the ferry of Pezo-de-Ragoa, his troops were attacked on all sides by the local population, which fired on his troops from above, and rolled rocks down the slopes at them, forcing them to retreat back to Almeida.
26–28 June 1808	Battle of Valencia	Valencia, Valencia	Spanish victory	
26 June 1808	Sack of Villa Viciosa	Villa Viciosa, District of Évora, Portugal	Manoeuvres (French)/sack	Avril, based at Estremoz, near Elvas, relieved the French garrison at Villa Viciosa, where the townsfolk had besieged the company of the 86th Regiment. The French force sacked the town.
26 June 1808	Sack of Beja	Beja, Portugal	Manoeuvres (French)/sack	Isolated in the centre of the insurrection in Portugal, Maransin had left Mertola to withdraw towards Lisbon with his 1,200 men. At Beja, a mass of citizens fired upon the French troops from the town's walls. The French force sacked the town. (See 18 June 1808, above.)
26 June 1808	Puerta del Rey (mountain pass)	Jaén, Andalusia	French victory	Vedel's column faced Lieutenant-Colonel Valdecaños's detachment of Spanish regulars and guerrillas with six guns blocking the mountain pass. The following day, Vedel met up with Dupont at La Carolina, reestablishing military communications with Madrid after a month of disruption. With the reinforcements from Vedel and Gobert, Dupont now had 20,000 men, albeit short of supplies.
27 June 1808	Gijón: Arrival of British officers	Asturias	Delegation	In response to the Junta General of Asturias' request to London, the Portland administration sent three British Army officers, led by a lieutenant colonel, to Gijón to assess the state of affairs. Following the Spanish victory at Bailén the following month, the Secretary of State for War and the Colonies, Viscount Castlereagh sent a second delegation, led by General Sir James Leith, who arrived in Gijón on 30 August 1808 charged with seeing how the north of Spain could be reinforced to prevent Napoleon sending in more troops through Irun, and isolating him in Madrid or Burgos. Leith would join Baird's forces in November 1808.
30 June 1808		Balearic Islands to mainland Spain	Manoeuvres (Spanish)	The corps of 10,000 men stationed in the Balearic Islands was the nearest force able to succour Catalonia. Faced with the open mutiny of the Aragonese and Catalan battalions of his army, the Captain-General at Palma, General Vives, in charge of the garrisons of Majorca and Minorca finally agreed to send troops from Port Mahon to the mainland. (Note: The mutiny was led by Vives's second-in-command, the Marquis del Palacio, governor of Minorca who, a fortnight later, finally set sail with the greater part of the Balearic garrisons. Part of Vives's reluctance to leave Port Mahon without troops had been due to his "deeply rooted idea" that the English would once again control Minorca, as they had for the greater part of the 18th century. (Oman, 1902: p. 323.)) The Aragonese regiment landed near Tortosa, and marched for Saragossa, while the bulk of the expeditionary force, nearly 5,000 strong, was put ashore in Catalonia between 19 and 23 July.
2–3 July 1808	Sack of Jaen	Jaen, Jaén, Andalusia	Manoeuvres (French)	Dupont ordered Vedel, based at Baylen, to send a brigade, which sacked the city.
4 July 1808	Sack of Guarda	Guarda, District of Guarda, Portugal	Manoeuvres (French)	Loison left a garrison of 1,200 men at Almeida, having formed a provisional battalion of soldiers not deemed fit for forced marching, and spent a week moving through the mountains of Beira, skirmishing with insurgents along the way and sacking the town of Guarda. By the time he reached Abrantes he had lost 200 men, mostly stragglers killed by peasantry. His cruelty led to his nickname, "Maneta" (‘One-Hand’), being accursed for many years in Portugal.
13 July 1808 – 1 August 1808	Expeditionary force (British)	Cork, Ireland – Mondego Bay, Coimbra District, Portugal	Manoeuvres (British)	Wellington's expeditionary force, comprising thirteen battalions of infantry plus cavalry and artillery, 9,000 men in all, sailed from Cork, landing in Portugal on 1 August.
14 July 1808	Battle of Medina de Rioseco	Valladolid, Castile and León	French victory	Also known as the Battle of Moclín, from the name of a nearby hill held by Spanish infantry. Blake's Army of Galicia, with little training, managed to withstand Merle's initial attack but were unable to resist the attack by General Lasalle's elite cavalry division.
16–19 July 1808	Battle of Bailén	Jaén, Andalusia	Spanish victory (decisive)	Having lost some 2,000 men on the battlefield, together with some 800 Swiss troops that had gone over to Reding's Swiss regiment, Dupont called for a truce, formally surrendered his remaining 17,600 men on 23 July. Under the terms of surrender, Dupont, Vedel and their troops were to be repatriated to France. However, with the exception of the most senior officers, most of the French rank and file were confined on hulks in Cádiz, before being transported to the uninhabited island of Cabrera, where half of the 7,000 men starved to death.
24 July 1808 – 16 August 1808	Second Siege of Girona	Girona, Catalonia	Spanish victory	
29 July 1808	Battle of Évora	Alentejo (Portugal)	French victory	The following day, the French General Loison massacred the men, women, and children, of Évora, marking the future of the relationships between the different nations.
1 August 1808 – 17 December 1808	Blockade of Barcelona	Barcelona, Catalonia	French victory	
7 August 1808 – 11 October 1808	Evacuation of the La Romana Division	Denmark–Spain by sea	Manoeuvres (Spanish)	Some 9,000 men stationed in Denmark, belonging to the 15,000-strong Division of the North, comprising Spanish troops commanded by Pedro Caro, 3rd Marquis of la Romana, defected from the armies of the First French Empire under the leadership of Marshal Bernadotte. Transported aboard British navy ships, on reaching Santander, they reinforced Blake's Army of Galicia. Entering into battle at Valmaseda, on 5 November 1808, they defeated Victor's army, only to be defeated by the same forces a few days later at the Battle of Espinosa.
17 August 1808	Battle of Roliça	Leiria (Portugal)	Anglo-Portuguese victory, tactical French retreat	The first battle fought by the British army during the Peninsular War.
21 August 1808	Battle of Vimeiro	Lisbon (Portugal)	Anglo-Portuguese victory	Wellesley (not yet Wellington) was superseded in command by Generals Sir Harry Burrard and Sir Hew Dalrymple. This defeat for the French led to the signing of the Convention of Sintra on 30 August 1808, putting an end to Napoleon's invasion of Portugal.
27 August 1808	Alfaro (Bridge of) & Tudela	Alfaro, La Rioja, Tudela, Navarre & Miranda de Ebro	Manoeuvres (Spanish)/skirmishes	On 27 August, following Palafox's instructions to push as far up the Ebro as he could, Eugenio Eulalio Palafox Portocarrero, Count of Montijo, at the head of a column of the Army of Aragón reached the bridge at Alfaro, almost opposite the left flank of the French forces at Milagro. When attacked there by Lefebvre-Desnouettes's cavalry, the Spanish column retreated to Tudela, where Marshal Moncey met them with an infantry division. Again, Montijo retreated. Thinking that these skirmishes must be mere diversions, and under the impression that the attack would be coming from that side, King Joseph moved his reserves up the river to Miranda. Montijo, however, had given way simply because his troops were raw levies, and because his nearest support was Saragossa. It would not be until some three weeks later that Spanish forces made another offensive move.
30 August 1808	Convention of Sintra	Lisbon (Portugal)	French troops abandon Portugal	Following his victory at the Battle of Vimeiro (21 August) Sir Arthur Wellesley, against his wishes, was ordered by his immediate superiors, Sir Harry Burrard and Sir Hew Dalrymple, to sign the preliminary Armistice. The subsequent convention, the Convention of Cintra, agreed between Dalrymple and Kellerman, and despite the protests of the Portuguese commander, Freire, allowed the evacuation of Junot's 20,900 troops from Portugal to France with all their equipment and 'personal property' (mostly loot) aboard Royal Navy ships. The public outcry in Britain led to an inquiry, held 14 November to 27 December 1808, which cleared all three British officers. Shortly after, George Woodward would caricature Wellesley in The Convention of Cintra, a Portuguese Gambol for the amusement of Iohn Bull, London, 1809 Lieutenant-General Sir John Moore took over command of the army in Portugal.
10–20 September 1808	Bilbao (Relief of)	Bilbao, Basque Country	Spanish victory	Contrary to the plan of operations decided on at Madrid on 5 September, by which he was to meet up with the armies of Castaños and of Eguia, neither of which were ready, on 10 September Blake set in motion his own plan to threaten Burgos with a small portion of his army of some 32,000 Galicians and Asturians, while with the main body he would march on Bilbao. Having sent his 'vanguard' and 'reserve' brigades towards Burgos, Blake moved on Bilbao with four complete divisions, with the Marquis of Portazgo's division routing General Monthion's garrison there on 20 September.
26 September 1808	Bilbao (Retreat from)	Bilbao, Basque Country	Manoeuvres (Spanish)	Having routed General Monthion's garrison the previous week, Marquis of Portazgo's division was forced to abandon the city as Ney approached. Although Portazgo occupied it again 12 October, he was forced to abandon the place once again.
12 October 1808	Combat of Sant Cugat	Sant Cugat del Vallès, Barcelona, Catalonia	Spanish victory	
16 October 1808		Almeida, Portugal	Manoeuvres (British)	Having left 9,000 troops at Almeida, as well as sending 4,000 troops, under Lt Gen Sir John Hope towards Madrid via Elvas, Lt Gen Sir John Moore, the commander of British forces in Portugal, entered Spain with 17,000 troops to meet up with Sir David Baird's 12,300 troops then marching towards Leon from Coruña.
31 October 1808	Battle of Zornoza	Biscay, Basque Country	Indecisive	Although a tactical victory for the French, it was considered a strategic blunder
5 November 1808	Battle of Valmaseda	Balmaseda, Biscay, Basque Country	Spanish victory	While retreating from his defeat at Bernagoitia the previous (Battle of Zornoza) (31 October), Blake turned around and, at Valmaseda, defeated General Villate's vanguard division.
7 November 1808	Battle of Güeñes	Güeñes, Biscay, Basque Country	French victory	The orderly retreat made by Blake's Army of the Left was covered by General Genaro Figueroa's 1st Division.
7 November 1808 – 5 December 1808	Siege of Roses	Girona, Catalonia	French victory	
10 November 1808	Battle of Gamonal	Burgos, Castile and León (Note: Originally a hamlet outside the city, Gamonal has been part of the city of Burgos since 1955.)	French victory	The Conde de Belvedere, at the head of the 1st Division (4,000 foot, 400 horse and twelve guns) of the army of Estremadura, plus the greater part of the 2nd Division (about 3,000 infantry and two regiments of hussars) of the same army, had arrived to reinforce the 1,600 men (plus four guns) of the Burgos garrison. The Spanish forces therefore totalled some 8,600 bayonets, 1,100 sabres, and sixteen guns which would face Napoleon's French forces, (Note: Napoleon was at Vitoria for four days, where, among other reports, he had been waiting to hear that Bessières, his vanguard, had occupied Burgos (Oman, 1902).) under Soult, (Note: Bessières was superseded by Soult.) of some 70,000 men (although of these, only around 18,000 bayonets and 6,500 sabres would be deployed for the battle).
10–11 November 1808	Battle of Espinosa	Burgos, Castile and León	French victory	General Acevedo, incapacitated as commander-in-chief of his Asturian division, handed over the command to General Llano Ponte, and was evacuated. On 12 November, with a small escort, led by Rafael del Riego, then a captain, Acevedo was stopped by a cavalry patrol of the Trascher Provisional Regiment and hacked to death. Riego was unharmed, but taken prisoner.
23 November 1808	Battle of Tudela	Tudela, Navarre	French-Polish victory	
29 November 1808	Combat at Bubierca	Bubierca, Province of Zaragoza	French victory	Maurice Mathieu's French troops beat Francisco Xavier Venegas.
30 November 1808	Battle of Somosierra	Mountain pass 60 miles north of Madrid separating the provinces of Madrid and Segovia	French victory	Famous for the Polish light cavalry's uphill charge, in columns of four, against Spanish artillery positions. The heavily outnumbered Spanish detachment of conscripts and artillery were unable to stop the Grande Armée's advance on Madrid, and Napoleon entered the capital of Spain on 4 December, a month after having entered the country.
4 December 1808	Capitulation of Madrid.	Madrid	French victory	Napoleon entered Madrid with 80,000 troops and turned his troops against Moore's British forces, who were forced to retreat back towards Galicia three weeks later and, after a last stand at the Battle of Corunna in January 1809, withdrew from Spain.
9–11 December 1808	General St. Cyr sets off to relieve Duhesme at Barcelona	Roses – Barcelona	Manoeuvres (French)	Having captured Rosas (See 7 November 1808, above), General St. Cyr was now able to return to his initial task of relieving Duhesme at Barcelona. Leaving Reille's division of 5,000–5,500 soldiers to hold Figueres and Roses, watch Girona, and protect the high-road to Perpignan, St. Cyr headed south with the divisions of Souham, Pino, and Chabot, a force of some 15,000 infantry and 1,500 horse. Realising that Girona would be able to hold out longer than the timeline available (Duhesme had reported that their provisions would only last until the end of that month), and after failing to draw its commanders, Lazán and Álvarez to meet him in the open, and as the place commanded the high-road, St. Cyr chose the inland by-paths, meaning that he was forced to send his guns and heavy baggage back to Figueres.
15 December 1808	Skirmish at fortress of Hostalrich	Hostalric, Girona, Catalonia	French victory	The Spanish garrison came out and skirmished with the rearguard of St. Cyr's column (See 9 December 1808, above), but without doing much harm.
15 December 1808	Combat at Sant Celoni	Sant Celoni, Catalonia	French victory	St. Cyr's column (See 9 December 1808, above), proceeding in single file, with the dragoons dismounted and leading their horses, descended into the Barcelona chaussée near Sant Celoni, where it was attacked by four battalions of miquelets, sent by Vives.
16 December 1808	Battle of Cardadeu	Barcelona, Catalonia	French victory	
20 December 1808 – 20 February 1809	Second Siege of Zaragoza	Zaragoza, Aragón	French victory	
21 December 1808	Battle of Molins de Rei	Barcelona, Catalonia	French victory	
21 December 1808	Battle of Sahagún	León, Castile and León	British victory	
24 December 1808	Combat of Tarancón	Tarancón, Cuenca, Castilla–La Mancha	Spanish victory/Manoeuvres	The Duke of the Infantado sent General Venegas, with the vanguard of the Army of the Centre, together with greater part of his cavalry, to surprise the French brigade of dragoons at Tarancón. The two French regiments escaped the town with the loss of fifty or sixty men and the Spanish cavalry arrived too late to give chase. The vanguard of the Spanish forces planning to evict King Joseph from Madrid remained at Tarancón until 11 January, when they withdrew to Uclés. (See 13 January 1809, below.)
25 December 1808	Retreat to Corunna		British retreat	John Moore started a 250-mile (400 km) retreat (reaching La Coruña on 14 January).
29 December 1808	Massacre of Chinchón	Chinchón, New Castile (now Community of Madrid)	Massacre/sack	In retaliation for the murder of four French soldiers in the town two day previously, the French troops based at Aranjuez executed 86 people, both in the town itself and on the road to Aranjuez, and set fire to numerous buildings. Goya, whose brother was a priest in Chinchón during that period, makes a reference to this, and other tragedies of war in his etching "This is worse" ("Esto es peor"), part of the series The Disasters of War.
29 December 1808	Battle of Benavente	Zamora, Castile and León	British victory	
30 December 1808	Battle of Mansilla	León, Castile and León	French victory	

=== 1809 ===
Date	Event	Province/region (modern)	Outcome	Notes
1 January 1809	Battle of Castellón	Girona, Catalonia	Spanish victory	This Castellón refers to Castelló d'Empúries, in Catalonia, not the town or province in Valencia.
3 January 1809	Battle of Cacabelos	León, Castile and León	British victory	
13 January 1809	Battle of Uclés	Cuenca, Castile-La Mancha	French victory	
14 January 1809	Treaty between Great Britain and Spain	London	Treaty	"Treaty of peace, friendship, and alliance" by which Britain recognises Fernando as King of Spain.
16 January 1809	Battle of Corunna	A Coruña, Galicia	Different analyses: British tactical victory French strategic victory (Note: "Canning strenuously maintained... in the great British tradition of characterizing defeat as victory..." (Fremont-Barnes, 2004, p. 80.))	Also known as the Battle of Elviña. The British troops were able complete their embarkation, but left the port cities of Corunna and Ferrol, as well as the whole of northern Spain, to be captured and occupied by the French. During the battle, Sir John Moore, the British commander, was mortally wounded.
18 January 1809	Corunna (Surrender of)	A Coruña, Galicia	French victory	Alcedo, whose garrison of two Spanish regiments had protected Sir John Moore's troops during the embarkation, surrendered to Marshal Soult, who was able to refit with the ample military stores available. A week later Soult's forces also captured Ferrol, a major Spanish naval base with an even greater arsenal than that of Corunna, taking eight ships of the line.
18 January 1809	Combat of Tortola	Tórtola, Guadalajara, Castile-La Mancha	French victory	Following the defeat at Uclés (See 13 January 1809, above), battle at which he was not present, Infantado, withdrawing towards Chinchilla, in the kingdom of Murcia, via his base at Cuenca, went ahead of his artillery. Fifteen guns, escorted by a single cavalry regiment, were captured by Digeon's dragoons at Tortola, a few miles to the south of Cuenca.
31 January 1809	French troops garrison Vigo	Vigo, Galicia	Manoeuvres (French)	On his way to Portugal, Marshal Soult left a garrison of 700 men at Vigo to prevent the British using its harbour to supply the Galician insurgents. As soon as Soult had moved on to Orense, the Galicians, headed by Pablo Morillo, a lieutenant of the regular army, and Manuel Garcia del Barrio, a colonel dispatched by the Central Junta from Seville, blockaded the city. (See 27 March 1809, below.)
3 February 1809	Second French invasion of Portugal	Galicia-Portugal	Manoeuvres (French)	Marshal Soult's II Corps headed down from La Coruña, in the north of Spain, to occupy the capital of Portugal, Lisbon. Napoleon later modified his original plan by ordering Marshal Victor's I Corps, based at Mérida, to send a column commanded by General Lapisse, located in Salamanca, to march westwards, first on Ciudad Rodrigo and then on to Almeida, in Portugal. The campaign came to an end following the French defeat by Anglo-Portuguese forces at the Second Battle of Porto (12 May 1809, see below), with Soult's army dispersed and having to abandon large amounts of equipment to flee across the mountains back into the north of Spain.
25 February 1809	Battle of Valls	Tarragona, Catalonia	French victory	
6 – 7 March 1809	Battle of Monterey	Monterrey, Orense, Galicia	French victory	
7 March 1809				British General William Beresford appointed Commander-in-Chief of the Portuguese Army.
10 March 1809	Aguilar de Campoo (Capture of)	Aguilar de Campóo, Palencia, Castile and León	Spanish victory	Juan Díaz Porlier's irregular troops captured the French battalion garrisoned at Aguilar, taking prisoner nine officers, 400 soldiers and seizing two 4-pounder guns, which were taken to Oviedo and handed over to the Junta. For this action, Porlier was promoted to brigadier and his second-in-command, Amor, to captain.
10–12 March 1809	First Siege of Chaves	Norte (Portugal)	French victory	Francisco da Silveira would later recapture the town at the Second Siege of Chaves (21–25 March 1809).
17 March 1809	Battle of Villafranca	León, Castile and León	Spanish victory	
17 March 1809	Combat of Mesas de Ibor	Mesas de Ibor, Cáceres, Extremadura	French victory	Despite his strong position, with six guns and 5,000 troops, on the heights of the other side of the ravine at the river Ibor, Duke del Parque was forced to retreat, pushing his guns over the precipice, by Leval's eight battalions.
20 March 1809	Battle of Braga	Braga (Portugal)	French victory	Also known as the Battle of Póvoa de Lanhoso or Battle of Carvalho d'Este.
20 March 1809	Combat of Berrocal	Cáceres, Extremadura	Spanish victory	Henestrosa, as the rearguard of Cuesta's Army of Estremadura and faced with Lasalle pressing him, made a sudden halt and drove in the leading squadron of the French by a charge of his Royal Carbineers. The skirmish at Miajadas the following day would be an even greater Spanish victory. (See 21 March 1809, below.)
21 March 1809	Battle of Miajadas	Miajadas, Cáceres, Extremadura	Spanish victory	
21–25 March 1809	Second Siege of Chaves	Norte (Portugal)	Portuguese victory	
24 March 1809	Battle of Los Yébenes	Toledo, Castile-La Mancha	Spanish victory	
27 March 1809	Battle of Ciudad Real	Ciudad Real, Castile-La Mancha	French-Polish victory	
27 March 1809	Capitulation of Vigo	Vigo, Galicia	Anglo-Spanish victory	Articles of Capitulation signed between Chalot, the Governor and Commandant of the French troops garrisoned in the town and forts of Vigo, on the one part; and Crawford, captain of the British frigate, Venus, deputed by George McKinley, captain of HMS Lively and Commanding Officer before Vigo, and Morillo, Colonel Commandant of the Spanish troops before the town, on the other. (See 31 January 1809, above.)
28 March 1809	Battle of Medellín	Medellín, Extremadura	French victory	
29 March 1809	First Battle of Porto	Porto (Portugal)	French victory	During the course of the battle, the collapse of the pontoon bridge, Ponte das Barcas (Bridge of Boats), on the River Douro led to the deaths of several thousands of mainly civilian non-combatants.
18 April 1809 – 2 May 1809	Battle of the Bridge of Amarante	Amarante, Porto, Portugal	French victory	Oman (1902, p. 250.) refers to it as the defence of Amarante. Following Francisco da Silveira's victory at Chaves (see 21 March 1809, above), Soult, in Porto, sent General Delaborde, Lorge, and Heudelet to assist Loison in opening up the route back to Spain. At Amarante, the Portuguese troops were able hold Loison, with 9,000 French troops, nearly half the army of Portugal, concentrated on the west bank of the Tâmega River for almost two weeks.
22 April 1809	Creation of Anglo-Portuguese Army			Having arrived at Lisbon on the 29th, Wellesley, Commander-in-Chief of the British Army, was appointed Commander-in-Chief of the Portuguese Army and integrated the two armies into mixed British-Portuguese divisions, normally on a basis of two British and one Portuguese brigades.
6 May 1809 – 12 December 1809	Third Siege of Girona	Girona, Catalonia	French victory	Depicted in The Great Day of Girona, by Ramon Martí Alsina.
10 May 1809 – 11 May 1809	Battle of Grijó	Porto (Portugal)	Anglo-Portuguese victory	
12 May 1809	Second Battle of Porto	Porto (Portugal)	Anglo-Portuguese victory (decisive)	Also known as the Battle of the Douro. Wellesley's British troops, reinforced by Portuguese units under Beresford's command, beat Soult at Oporto, forcing the French out of the country.
14 May 1809	Battle of Alcantara	Cáceres, Extremadura	French victory	
22 May 1809	Combat at Campo de Estrella	Santiago de Compostela, Galicia	Spanish victory	General La Carrera, having rested his 2000-strong detachment of regulars at Puebla de Sanabria, then marched them, plus six guns, up to form the core of the Division of the Minho, the newly raised insurrectionary army that Morillo and Garcia del Barrio had been training. The combined force of 10,000 men, of whom 7,000 had firearms, then approached Santiago, where Maucune's four battalions and a regiment of chasseurs met them outside the city and were repulsed, with Carrera forcing the French troops back into the town and chasing them for a league beyond it. Maucune, himself wounded, and having lost 600 men—a fifth of his whole force—and two guns, retreated in disorder to La Coruña.
23 May 1809	Battle of Alcañiz	Teruel, Aragón	Spanish victory	
2 June 1809	Combat at San Martín	San Martín, Asturias	Spanish victory	Pedro de la Bárcena was promoted to brigadier and given command of the Army of Asturias for defeating General Barthélemy Thomières's troops at the bridge of San Martin.
7 June 1809 – 9 June 1809	Battle of Puente Sanpayo	Pontevedra, Galicia	Spanish victory	
15 June 1809	Battle of María	Zaragoza, Aragón	French victory	
18 June 1809	Battle of Belchite	Zaragoza, Aragón	French victory	
27–28 July 1809	Battle of Talavera	Toledo, Castile-La Mancha	Anglo-Spanish victory Strategic French victory	Wellesley, who, together with Spanish troops under General Cuesta, had defeated the French army at this battle then had to return to Portugal when Marshal Soult's army threatened his lines of communication.
5 August 1809	Action at Aranjuez	Aranjuez		Venegas reported having beaten off three successive attacks by vastly superior forces numbering 14–15,000 troops.
8 August 1809	Battle of Arzobispo	Toledo, Castile-La Mancha	French victory	
11 August 1809	Battle of Almonacid	Toledo, Castile–La Mancha	French victory	
12 August 1809	Battle of Puerto de Baños	Cáceres, Extremadura	French victory	Mountain pass
6 September 1809	Combat of San Gregorio	Girona, Catalonia	Spanish victory	The French général de brigade Dominique Joba, while serving under Général de division Verdier at the third siege of Girona (see above) was killed in action at San Gregorio, where he had been sent with three brigades to clear the main road to Figueras of the miqueletes led by Rovira and Claros.
23 September 1809	Combat at Potes	Potes, Asturias		Pedro de la Bárcena distinguished himself.
9 October 1809	Combat of Astorga	León, Castile and León	Spanish victory	Apparently unaware that the town had recently been heavily garrisoned, Kellerman sent Carrié with 1,200 infantry and two regiments of dragoons to attack the town.
18 October 1809	Battle of Tamames	Salamanca, Castile and León	Spanish victory	
25 October 1809	Battle of Maguelone	Gulf of Roses, Girona, Catalonia	British victory	A running naval battle
26 October 1809	Wellington orders construction of the Lines of Torres Vedras	Lisbon, Portugal	Fortification (Anglo-Portuguese)	Wellington orders construction of the Lines. Under the direction of Sir Richard Fletcher, the first line was completed one year later, around the time of the Battle of Sobral.
11 November 1809	Combat of Ocaña	Toledo, Castile-La Mancha	French victory	Ocaña is a small town 65 km from Madrid, defended by five regiments of Milhaud's dragoons and Sebastiani's division (six battalions) of Polish infantry. Aréizaga sent his cavalry force, 5,700 strong, which outnumbered the French cavalry by three-to-one, and forced them to retreat behind the Polish infantry. After attempting to attack the squares, Aréizaga realised that they would have to wait for Zayas's infantry to arrive and attack the following day. The French, however, retreated overnight to Aranjuez. Aréizaga entered the town the following day.
18 November 1809	Combat of Ontigola	Ontigola (near Ocaña)	French victory	The cavalry of Milhaud and Paris (who was killed in the battle), made up of eight regiments, numbering almost 3,000 men, and riding at the head of the French army, crossed the Tagus river at Aranjuez and met Freire's four divisions of horsemen, over 4,000 sabres, moving at the head of Aréizaga's column. According to Oman (1908), "the collision of Milhaud and Freire brought about the largest cavalry fight which took place during the whole Peninsular War".
19 November 1809	Battle of Ocaña	Toledo, Castile-La Mancha	French victory	At Ocaña, 65 km from Madrid, French forces under Soult and King Joseph Bonaparte caused the greatest single defeat of Spanish army, leaving twenty-six thousand out of the fifty-four thousand Spanish troops, under Aréizaga, dead, wounded, or imprisoned.
23 November 1809	Battle of Carpio	Valladolid, Castile and León	Spanish victory	El Carpio, some 20 km southwest of the town of Medina del Campo, is about 4 km from Fresno el Viejo. Both villages border the province of Salamanca at the southwestern tip of the province of Valladolid. The village, including its strategic 10th-century fortress was completely destroyed by the French troops on 25 November.
26 November 1809	Battle of Alba de Tormes	Salamanca, Castile and León	French victory	

=== 1810 ===
Date	Event	Province/region (modern)	Outcome	Notes
21 January 1810	Battle of Mollet	Barcelona, Catalonia	Spanish victory	
31 January 1810	Capture of Oviedo	Oviedo, Asturias	French victory	The captain-general of Asturias, Antonio Arce, with some 4,000 men to cover the whole of Asturias, (Note: The Duke del Parque, had moved his forces south, taking with him Ballasteros's division, which had formed the core of the Army of Asturias. (Oman, 1908: p. 217.)) plus some new levies, little more than 2,000 strong, raised at Oviedo, evacuated that city without offering much resistance to General Bonet's 7,000 troops out of Santander. However, by seizing Infiesto and Gijon, Juan Díaz Porlier effectively cut off Bonet's communication with Santander, forcing the French general to abandon Oviedo and head back towards Santander in order to clear his rear, whereby the Spanish general Bárcena was able to reoccupy the Asturian capital. (See 14 February 1810, below.)
1 February 1810	Seville (surrender of)	Seville, Andalusia	French victory	King Joseph, accompanied by Marshals Soult and Victor, entered Seville, the Central Junta having abandoned the city to its fate.
5 February 1810 – 24 August 1812	Siege of Cádiz	Cádiz, Andalusia	Spanish victory	The reconstituted national government of Spain, known as the Cortes of Cádiz—effectively a government-in-exile—fortified itself in Cádiz, besieged by 70,000 French troops.
14 February 1810	Combat of Colloto & capture of Oviedo	Colloto, Asturias	French victory	Bonet, having secured his line back to Santander, returned to take Oviedo, the capital of Asturias, again, (See 31 January 1810, above.) after defeating Bárcena—who had reoccupied the city—at Colloto, just outside Oviedo. The Roman bridge of Colloto, crosses the Nora River on the Roman road that connected Cantabria with Gallaecia. It was declared a Cultural heritage monument in 2003.
20 February 1810	Battle of Vic	Barcelona, Catalonia	French victory	
22 February 1810	Guerrilla attack at Cariñena	Cariñena, Aragón	Guerrilla warfare	Guerrilla chiefs Juan Vera and Roque Lafuente joined forces to attack a 48-man French convoy of three wagons transporting ammunition and 52 of Villacampa's troops that had been taken prisoner.
19 March 1810	Skirmish at Grado	Grado, Asturias	Spanish victory	José Cienfuegos, appointed by the Asturian junta to take command of Arce's Asturian troops, resumed the offensive operations against Bonet. Following the skirmish, and once again concerned with Juan Díaz Porlier's rear attacks, Bonet abandoned Oviedo, for the third time, withdrawing to Cangas de Onis. (See 14 February 1810, above.)
21 March 1810	Battle of Vilafranca	Vilafranca del Penedès, Catalonia	Spanish victory	
21 March 1810 – 22 April 1810	Siege of Astorga	León, Castile and León	French victory	
29 March 1810	Capture of Oviedo	Oviedo, Asturias	French victory	For the fourth time in three months, Bonet took the capital of Asturias. (See 19 March 1810, above.) The Spanish troops once again retired without offering serious opposition, and were finally forced to retreat to Tineo in the mountains. Bonet's 7,000 men were now immobilized for the rest of the year, having to garrison Oviedo, the ports of Gijon and Aviles, as well as all the central and eastern Asturias, and, moreover, to defend the communication with Santander from Juan Díaz Porlier's continued attacks.
5 April 1810	Battle of Manresa	Manresa, Catalonia	Spanish victory	
14 April 1810	Combat of El Padrún	El Padrún (Baíña), Asturias	Spanish victory	Although Pedro de la Bárcena's troops were victorious at El Padrún, in the parish of Baíña (Mieres), later that month they were unable to hold the line at the Nalón (see 26 April, below), and were forced to retreat to Mieres.
15 April 1810	Lleida: arrival of Suchet's troops	Lleida, Catalonia	Manoeuvres (French)	Suchet's army of 13,000 French troops arrived in front of Lleida. The siege proper started on 29 April.
23 April 1810	Battle of Margalef	Tarragona, Catalonia	French victory	On 22 April, a Spanish force of 8,000 infantry and 600 cavalry, incorporated into two divisions led by Ibarrola and Pirez, under O’Donnell, descended the Monblanc defile of the Prades Mountains to relieve Lleida. They were surprised by Musnier's seven infantry battalions and 500 cuirassieres which, together with Harispe's three infantry battalions and two squadrons of hussars that had been stationed at Alcoletge, a bridgehead three miles from Lleida, forced them to retreat to the ruined village of Margalef, some 10 miles from Lleida.
26 April 1810	Combat at the Nalón	Nalón, Asturias	French victory	Pedro de la Bárcena's troops were unable to hold the line at the Nalón and were forced to retreat to Mieres.
26 April 1810 – 9 July 1810	First siege of Ciudad Rodrigo	Salamanca, Castile and León	French victory	
29 April 1810 – 13 May 1810	Siege of Lleida	Lleida, Catalonia	French victory	
15 May 1810 – 8 June 1810	Siege of Mequinenza	Zaragoza, Aragon	French victory	
11 July 1810	Combat of Barquilla	Salamanca, Castile and León	French victory	
11 July 1810	Landing at Santoña	Santoña, Cantabria	Manoeuvres (Anglo-Spanish)	Captain Mends, on board HMS Arethusa off Bermeo, informed the commander-in-chief of the Western Squadron, Lord Gambier, that his squadron, also composed of HMS Medusa, under Captain Bowles; HMS Narcissus (1801), under Captain Aylmer, who would also lead the landing party; HMS Dryad (1795); HMS Amazon (1799); (Note: These ships would, later that year, also participate in the Anglo-Spanish Cantabrian Expedition (see 14 October 1810, below), following which two of the Spanish ships, the frigate Santa Maria Magdalena and the brigantine Palomo, would be destroyed in a storm off the coast of Galicia with great loss of life, Magdalena having collided with Narcissus shortly before going down.) and HMS Cossack (1806), had successfully participated in the landing of Brigadier-general Porlier's 500 men and that a brigade of British seamen and Marines had also been part of the landing party and had seen action onshore. Mends, as well as commending the officers and men serving under him, ends his dispatch by praising Porlier and the gallantry of his "small band of officers and soldiers".
24 July 1810	Battle of the Côa	Guarda, (Portugal)	French victory	After having blown up the Real Fuerte de la Concepción on 20 July, Craufurd positioned his Light Brigade, comprising five battalions of infantry, two light cavalry regiments, and one horse artillery battery (about 4200 infantry, 800 cavalry, and 6 guns) east of the Côa River (disobeying Wellington's orders), near Castelo de Almeida and near the only bridge of an otherwise unfordable river. On the morning of the battle, they were surprised by Marshal Ney's 20,000 troops, on their way to besiege Almeida. Craufurd was able to defend the bridge against several attacks, but finally retreated at midnight. The Real Fuerte de la Concepción, in the province of Salamanca, was one of a series of star forts on the Spanish side of the border between Spain and Portugal. The Praça-forte de Almeida, 10 km away, in the Guarda District, was one of a series of Portuguese star forts.
25 July – 27 August 1810	First siege of Almeida	Guarda, (Portugal)	French victory	
29 July 1810		Sanabria, Zamora	French victory	At the head of 5,000 troops, General Seras attacked the castle at Puebla de Sanabria, near the border with Portugal, garrisoned by 3,000 Spanish troops. When the Spanish general, Taboada, abandoned the place, the French took twenty pieces of artillery and enough provisions for 3,000 troops for six months. Silveira, concerned, immediately prepared to defend the frontier. However, Seras unexpectedly turned back to Zamora, leaving a battalion of the 2nd Swiss Regiment and a squadron of horse to garrison the place. Silveira and Taboada immediately united their forces, and routed the French from the castle, forcing it into the town on 4 August, where it was forced to surrender a week later, with some 20 officers and 350 men, of an original 600, taken prisoner. Seras returned too late to succour his garrison, and retired to Benavente, whereupon Taboada reoccupied the place. Seras then had to head up to the north where Bonet was being bothered by Porlier's actions, with Bonet asking him to attack Porlier's force in the rear.
11 August 1810	Combat of Villagarcia	Villagarcía de la Torre, Extremadura	French victory	
15 August 1810	Action at Linares de Cornellana	Cornellana, Asturias	Spanish victory	After having been forced to retreat to Mieres (see 26 April 1810, above), Bárcena was able to reorganise his troops and was victorious at the action of Linares de Cornellana and, later that month, at Campomanes (see 24 August 1810, below).
24 August 1810	Action at Campomanes	Campomanes, Asturias	Spanish victory	After having been forced to retreat to Mieres (see 26 April 1810, above), Bárcena was able to reorganise his troops and was victorious at the action of Linares de Cornellana (see 15 April 1810, above) and, later that month, at Campomanes.
10 September 1810	Combat at Begur	Begur, Girona, Catalonia	English victory	An English landing-party stormed the coastal battery, capturing the garrison of 50 men.
14 September 1810	Battle of La Bisbal	Girona, Catalonia	Anglo-Spanish victory	
14 September 1810	Actions at Palamos, San Feliu & Calonje	Palamós, Sant Feliu & Calonge, Girona, Catalonia	Anglo-Spanish victory	On the same day that O'Donnell was taking La Bisbal (see above), General Doyle (the British commissioner in Catalonia) and Captain Fane, having sailed from Tarragona on the British frigate Cambrian (Fane's ship) accompanying the Spanish frigate Diana, and a few transports, led a landing-force, numbering some 500 troops, to storm Palamós while the Spanish troops under Colonel Fleires took Sant Feliu, and Colonel Aldea cut off the French troops at Calonge. That day, Anglo-Spanish forces captured General Schwartz, two colonels, fifty-six officers, and 1,183 rank and file, with seventeen guns, leaving Schwartz's brigade completely out of action.
15 September 1810	Battle of Fuente de Cantos	Fuente de Cantos, Extermadura	French victory	
24 September 1810	Cortes of Cádiz – opening session	Cádiz, Andalusia		The opening session of the Cortes was held eight months into the two-and-a-half-year Siege of Cádiz.
27 September 1810	Battle of Bussaco	Serra do Bussaco mountain range, Aveiro District (Portugal)	Anglo-Portuguese victory	Marshal Masséna, having captured the border fortresses of Ciudad Rodrigo and Almeida, advanced into Portugal. At Bussaco, Wellington's Anglo-Portuguese army drove them off with the loss of about 1,250 killed or wounded, compared to French losses of 4,500 men.
1–2 October 1810	Action at Pola de Lena	Pola de Lena, Asturias		Pedro de la Bárcena's Vanguard Division of the Army of Asturias saw action at Pola de Lena.
1–2 October 1810	Sack of Coimbra	Coimbra, Coimbra District, Portugal		Masséna's troops sacked the city over two days; the first division of the 8th Corps, consisting mainly of newly formed battalions of conscripts arriving on 1 October. No attempt was made to restore order until the 6th Corps entered the next day, although the plunder continued.
6 October 1810	Action at Pola de Lena	Pola de Lena, Asturias		Pedro de la Bárcena's Vanguard Division of the Army of Asturias saw action at Pola de Lena (see 1–2 October 1810, above).
6 October 1810	Trant's Raid	Coimbra, Portugal	Portuguese victory	Coimbra is recaptured by Portuguese militia led by Nicholas Trant.
13–14 October 1810	Battle of Sobral	Lisbon (Portugal)	Anglo-Portuguese victory	
14 October – 2 November 1810	Cantabrian Expedition	La Coruña (Galicia)–Gijón (Asturias)–Santoña (Cantabria)–Viveiro (Galicia)	Manoeuvres (Anglo-Spanish)	Having previously collaborated on a joint mission (see 11 July 1810, above) another Anglo-Spanish landing operation set off to establish a base at Santoña, from which to free the western part of the coast of the Cantabrian Sea of French troops and then move on to free up the central and eastern coast of the region, effectively cutting off Irun as the main gateway for French supplies into Spain. The squadron, under the command of Captain Joaquín Zarauz, sailed from La Coruña on 14 October 1810. The British squadron, led by Captain Mends, on board the frigate HMS Arethusa (1781), was also composed of the frigates HMS Medusa, under Captain Bowles; HMS Narcissus (1801), under Captain Aylmer, HMS Amazon (1799); and the brig-sloop HMS Port Mahon (1798). The landing party consisted of 1,200 Spanish troops, under Field Marshal Renovales and 800 British Marines. After an initial landing at Gijón, from which they drove the French garrison and captured large amounts of supplies, the expedition then headed for Santoña, where a gale forced the expedition to turn back. On their way into port at Viveiro, two of the Spanish ships, the frigate Santa Maria Magdalena and the brig Palomo, were both destroyed with great loss of life, Magdalena having collided with HMS Narcissus (1801) shortly before foundering. Of the 508 people on board the Magdalena, 500 perished in the storm, including her captain, Blas Salcedo, and the commander-in-chief of the Expedition, Zarauz. Of the eight people who managed to reach shore, five later died of their injuries. Of the 75 men on board the Palomo, 50 perished in the storm, while the remaining 25, including their captain, managed to reach the shore.
15 October 1810	Action at Pola de Lena	Pola de Lena, Asturias		Pedro de la Bárcena's Vanguard Division of the Army of Asturias saw action at Pola de Lena (see 1–2 October 1810, above).
15 October 1810	Battle of Fuengirola	Málaga, Andalusia	Polish-French victory	
18 October 1810	Plunder of Solsona	Solsona, Lleida, Catalonia	Manouevre/plunder (French)	The French Marshal Macdonald, at the head of two French and two Italian brigades, set off to do battle against the Marquis de Campoverde's Spanish troops. Stopping at Solsona, until then the seat of Junta of Upper Catalonia and finding the place deserted by its inhabitants, the French troops proceeded to plunder the town and burnt its cathedral.
20 October 1810	Action at El Fresno	El Fresno (Grado), Asturias		Pedro de la Bárcena's Vanguard Division of the Army of Asturias saw action at El Fresno (see 28 November 1810, below).
21 October 1810	Combat of Cardona	Cardona, Barcelona, Catalonia	Spanish victory	The Marquis de Campoverde's division, together with several thousand somatenes, had manned the town, its castle, and the neighbouring heights. Without waiting for Marshal Macdonald and the reserve brigade, the Italian general Eugenio marched straight at the position, with Salme's French brigade in support, and was forced to retreat.
31 October 1810	Combat at Alventosa	Albentosa, Teruel, Aragon	French victory	General Chłopicki, in the first of two successive engagements, defeated the partisan forces of Carbajal and Villacampa. (See 11 November 1810, below.)
4 November 1810	Battle of Baza	Granada, Andalusia	French victory	
11 November 1810	Combat at Fuensanta (Sanctuary of Our Lady of Fuensanta)	Villel, Teruel, Aragon	French victory	General Chłopicki, in the second of two successive engagements, defeated the partisan forces of Carbajal and Villacampa. (See 31 October 1810, above.)
28 November 1810	Action at El Fresno	El Fresno (Grado), Asturias		Pedro de la Bárcena's Vanguard Division of the Army of Asturias saw action again at El Fresno (see 20 October 1810, above).
16 December 1810 – 2 January 1811	Siege of Tortosa	Tortosa, Catalonia	French victory	
25 December 1810	Combat at Palamós	Palamós, Girona, Catalonia	French victory	Two French gunboats and eight transports on their way from Cette with provisions for the garrison at Barcelona were destroyed by a landing party from the British frigates based along the Catalan coast. Although the initial British raid was a success, they were surprised by a French flying column, and driven back to their boats with a loss of over 200 men, including the commanding officer, Captain Fane of HMS Cambrian, who was taken prisoner.
26 December – 28 December 1810	Action at Soto	Soto, Asturias		Pedro de la Bárcena's Vanguard Division of the Army of Asturias saw action at Soto.
31 December 1810	Ponte do Abbade (Combat of)	Ponte do Abbade, Guarda District, Portugal	French victory	Francisco da Silveira, with six militia regiments and the former garrison of Almeida, had orders to stay between General Claparède's force of 6,000 troops and Porto. The Portuguese had been following the French troops and, Claparède, based at Trancoso, which Silveira had initially retreated from on Claparède's approach, routed the Portuguese at Ponte do Abbade on 31 December. Having lost 200 men, Silveira retreated to Vila da Ponte, some seven miles away.

=== 1811 ===
Date	Event	Province/region (modern)	Outcome	Notes
1 January 1811	Action at Campomanes	Asturias		Pedro de la Bárcena's Vanguard Division of the Army of Asturias saw action at Campomanes.
11 January 1811	Vila da Ponte (Combat of) (Note: Not to be confused with the combat of Aldeia da Ponte, which took place later that year, on 28 September 1811.)	Aldeia da Ponte, Guarda District, Portugal	French victory	On 11 January, General Claparède made a second sortie from Trancoso, beating Francisco da Silveira's men even more decisively than at Ponte do Abbade the previous month, and pursued them to Lamego on the Douro. Silveira crossed the river on the 13th, and the news of his defeat brought terror to Oporto. Bacelar ordered the four battalions from Vizeu, Trant's seven battalions from Coimbra, and Wilson's four battalions from Peñacova, to join him. They concentrated at Castro Daire, ten miles south of Lamego, with a force of 14,000 bayonets, whereupon Claparéde, with less than half that number, and worried about being cut off, returned to Trancoso.
15 January 1811	Battle of El Pla	Tarragona, Catalonia	Spanish victory	
19–22 January 1811	Siege of Olivenza	Badajoz, Extremadura	French victory	
26 January 1811 – 11 March 1811	First Siege of Badajoz	Badajoz, Extremadura	French victory	The Spanish fortress fell to the French forces under Marshal Soult.
19 February 1811	Battle of the Gebora	Badajoz, Extremadura	French victory	
21 February 1811	Cádiz – Tarifa – Algeciras	Cádiz, Andalusia	Manoeuvres (Allied)	A mixed force of 9,500 Spanish, 4,900 British and a few hundred Portuguese set sail from Cádiz towards Tarifa, fifty miles to the south, in order to move inland and attack the French besiegers from the rear. However, due to bad weather, the force had to land at Algeciras; further than planned. (See 5 March 1811, below.)
5 March 1811	Battle of Barrosa	Cádiz, Andalusia	Anglo-Spanish victory	Throughout February–March, an Anglo-Iberian relief force had tried to break the French blockade of Cádiz. On 5 March, Marshal Victor attacked this force near Barrosa and, although the Allies succeeded in routing Victor's army, they were not able to lift the siege of Cádiz. (See 21 February 1811, above.)
8 March 1811	Action at Salas	Asturias		Pedro de la Bárcena's Vanguard Division of the Army of Asturias saw action at Salas.
11 March 1811	Battle of Pombal	Leiria (Portugal)	French victory	
12 March 1811	Battle of Redinha	Coimbra (Portugal)	Indecisive/Manoeuvres (French retreat)	
14 March 1811	Battle of Casal Novo	Coimbra (Portugal)	French victory	
15 March 1811	Capture of Alburquerque Castle	Alburquerque, Extremadura	French victory	The Governor, Major-General José de Cagigal (the younger brother of Fernando de Cagigal), surrendered the fortress, garrisoned by two battalions of the Estremaduran regiment of Fernando VII, about 800 men, and a few artillerymen with seventeen brass guns, to Latour-Maubourg, at the head of two cavalry regiments.
15 March 1811	Battle of Foz de Arouce	Lousã, Coimbra District, Portugal	Anglo-Portuguese victory	
15 March 1811 – 21 March 1811	Siege of Campo Maior Castle	Alentejo (Portugal)	French victory	The garrison, under Major José Joaquim Talaya, consisting of 800 Portuguese militia and a company of artillery, the garrison's only regulars, plus 50 old cannon, held out against 7,000 troops belonging to the V Corps under Marshal Mortier.
17 March 1811	Capture of Valencia de Alcantara Castle	Valencia de Alcantara, Extremadura	French victory	Having secured Alburquerque Castle (see 15 March 1811, above), Latour-Maubourg sent a regiment of dragoons to Valencia de Alcantara, the last fortified place in Spanish hands between the Guadiana and the Tagus. The small garrison evacuated it, and the dragoons, after bursting seven guns found within its walls, and blowing up its gates, returned to Badajoz.
18 March 1811	Action at El Puelo	Asturias		Pedro de la Bárcena's Vanguard Division of the Army of Asturias saw action at El Puelo. Bárcena was badly wounded.
25 March 1811	Battle of Campo Maior	Alentejo (Portugal)	Anglo-Portuguese victory	
3 April 1811	Battle of Sabugal	Guarda (Portugal)	Anglo-Portuguese victory	
9 – 10 April 1811	Capture of Sant Ferran Castle	Figueres, Girona	Spanish victory/Manoeuvres	In the early hours of 10 April, 700 miquelets sent by Francesc Rovira i Sala entered through the vaults of the citadel and caught the French garrison asleep. Within the hour the place had been won. By dawn, over 2,000 Catalans had manned the fortress. (See also 17 April 1811, below.)
10 April – 19 August 1811	Siege of Figueres	Sant Ferran Castle, Figueres, Girona	French victory	Following the miquelets's capture of the citadel (see 10 April 1811, above), General Peyri, with 1,500 Italian troops, had reoccupied the town of Figueres, below the citadel, waiting for reinforcements. It would not be until a week later that General Baraguey d’Hilliers, with 6,500 infantry and 500 cavalry, started the blockade proper of the citadel. (See also 19 August 1811, below.)
14 April – 10 May 1811	Second siege of Almeida	Guarda, (Portugal)	Allied victory	Also known as the Blockade of Almeida, since the Anglo-Portuguese Army had no heavy guns to breach the walls, they were forced to starve the garrison out. Because of this, it was technically a blockade rather than a siege. French troops abandoned the fort under cover of darkness and escaped. See Battle of Fuentes de Oñoro.
22 April – 12 May/18 May – 10 June 1811	Second Siege of Badajoz	Badajoz, Extremadura	French victory	The siege was briefly lifted while the Battle of Albuera was fought on 16 May.
3–6 May 1811	Battle of Fuentes de Oñoro	Salamanca, Castile and León	Tactically indecisive Anglo-Portuguese victory (strategic)	Spanish village on the border with Portugal. French troops under Masséna failed to relieve the fortress at Almeida after being narrowly defeated by Wellington at Fuentes de Oñoro. See Blockade of Almeida.
5 May 1811 – 29 June 1811	First siege of Tarragona	Tarragona, Catalonia	French victory	
16 May 1811	Battle of Albuera	Badajoz, Extremadura	Allied victory	Allied forces engaged the French Armée du Midi (Army of the South) some 20 kilometres (12 mi) south of Badajoz. Marshal Soult had set out to relieve Badajoz, besieged by Beresford. Soult outmanoeuvred his opponent at nearby Albuera but was forced to withdraw. Three days later, Wellington arrived at Badajoz, having marched from Almeida.
25 May 1811	First battle of Arlabán	Mountain pass between Gipuzkoa and Álava	Spanish victory	Guerrilla ambush led by Francisco Espoz y Mina. Also referred to as the First Surprise of Arlabán to distinguish it from the Second Surprise of Arlabán (April 1812).
25 May 1811	Battle of Usagre	Badajoz, Extremadura	Allied victory	
6 and 9 June 1811	Forts of Badajoz (two separate assaults)	Badajoz, Extremadura	French victory	Wellington made two assaults against the forts but was beaten back. French reinforcements forced him to abandon the siege.
23 June 1811	Battle of Cogorderos	León, Castile-León	Spanish victory	
30 June – 2 July 1811	Siege of Niebla	Niebla, Huelva, Andalusia	French victory	Instead of marching on Seville, Joaquín Blake laid siege to the Castle of Niebla, whose garrison consisted of a battalion of 600 Spanish and British deserters. However, an escalade having failed and having been unable to bring up artillery, due to the bad mountain roads, the Spanish troops were unable to take the place. Blake finally withdrew when Soult sent Conroux and Godinot to relieve the garrison. Although the siege itself was not successful, it did serve to draw 11,000 French troops into a remote corner of the region for some weeks.
29 July 1811	Battle of Montserrat	Barcelona, Catalonia	French victory	Irregular troops under Joaquín Ibáñez, Baron de Eroles were beaten by Louis Gabriel Suchet.
9 August 1811	Battle of Zujar	Granada, Andalusia	French victory	
19 August 1811		Sant Ferran Castle, Figueres, Girona	Surrender	With the fall of Figueres, which blocks the main road from Perpignan to Barcelona, Marshall Macdonald's troops, which had been detained for so long blockading the citadel, were now able to come to the assistance of Suchet's Army of Aragon to capture Valencia. (See also 10 April 1811, above)
25 September 1811	Battle of El Bodón	Salamanca, Castile and León	French victory	
28 September 1811	Aldeia da Ponte (Combat of) (Note: Not to be confused with the combat of Vila da Ponte, which took place earlier that year, on 11 January 1811.)	Aldeia da Ponte, Guarda District, Portugal		Wellington, having secured his ground at Alfayates, with his whole army, also considered Aldea da Ponte, to be too valuable to relinquish unless overwhelmed by a superior force. Even though it lay outside the intended line of battle, two miles away and on lower ground, it was a meeting-place of several roads and well placed for observation. Generals Thiébault and Souham Montbrun and Watier, under Marshal Marmont, had engaged the British troops there in skirmishes, but Marmont, on arriving, took the decision not to advance and ordered the retreat for Ciudad Rodrigo, while Wellington gave orders for his army to take up winter quarters.
4–14 October 1811	Battle of Cervera	Lleida, Catalonia	Spanish victory	
16 October 1811	Action at Ayerbe	Ayerbe, Huesca, Aragón	Spanish victory	A column of 800 Italian infantry, belonging to Severoli's division at Zaragoza, marching to relieve the garrison of Ayerbe, was surprised by Mina's 4,000 troops. The column "was exterminated", with two hundred Italians killed and six hundred (including many wounded) taken prisoner after a running fight between Ayerbe and Huesca. Mina then crossed 200 miles of French-occupied territory in Northern Spain to the Cantabrian coast at Motrico, where he handed over his prisoners to the British frigate HMS Isis.
25 October 1811	Battle of Saguntum	Valencia, Valencia	French victory	
25 October 1811	Action at Arroyo del Puerco	Cáceres, Extremadura	Spanish victory	Spanish cavalry under Penne Villemur forced Girard's troops to retreat to Malpartida, with General Hill arriving there the following day.
28 October 1811	Battle of Arroyo dos Molinos	Cáceres, Extremadura	Allied victory	
3 November 1811 – 9 January 1812	Siege of Valencia	Valencia, Valencia	French victory	
5 November 1811	First battle of Bornos	Cádiz, Andalusia	Spanish victory	
5 November 1811	Action at Puente de los Fierros (Lena)	Asturias		Pedro de la Bárcena, leading the 1st Brigade of the 1st Division, saw action at Puente de los Fierros.
7 November 1811	Action at Peñaflor (Grado)	Asturias		Pedro de la Bárcena, leading the 1st Brigade of the 1st Division, saw action at Peñaflor.
12 November 1811	Action at Tineo	Asturias	Spanish victory	Pedro de la Bárcena, leading the 1st Brigade of the 1st Division, saw action at Tineo, forcing Gauthier to retreat.
19 December 1811 – 5 January 1812	Siege of Tarifa	Cádiz, Andalusia	Allied victory	
29 December 1811	Combat of Navas de Membrillo	La Nava de Santiago, Badajoz	French victory	Hoping to surprise General Dembowski at Mérida, Hill's advanced cavalry chanced upon a troop of hussars at the head of a column of French infantry, three companies of the 88th regiment, some 400 men, who had been sent out to raise requisitions of food in the villages in the area. Hill sent two squadrons each of the 13th Light Dragoons and 2nd Hussars of the King's German Legion (KLG) in pursuit. The French captain formed his men in a square, and beat off five cavalry charges, with heavy loss to Hill's men: the KGL Hussars had two men killed and one officer and 17 men wounded, while the 13th Light Dragoons had one killed and 19 wounded. Dembowski, once warned of the approaching allied forces, evacuated Merida, where Hill, arriving the following day, found the French had abandoned 160,000 lb. of wheat. In a letter to the Secretary of State for War and the Colonies, the Earl of Liverpool, Wellington expressed his surprise at Dembowski being still alive, having thought that he had been killed at Arroyo dos Molinos the previous October.

=== 1812 ===
Date	Event	Province/region (modern)	Outcome	Notes
8 January 1812 – 20 January 1812	Second siege of Ciudad Rodrigo	Salamanca, Castile and León	Allied victory	Wellington laid siege to the town and by 19 January, his guns had opened up two gaps in its defences. That night, while the 3rd Division, attacking one breach, suffered heavily from a huge mine explosion, the Light Division assaulted the other and managed to force its way into the town. The French troops surrendered the town.
18 January 1812	Combat of Villaseca	Vila-seca, Tarragona, Catalonia	Spanish victory	Lafosse, the governor of Tortosa, on his way to relieve Tarragona with a battalion and a troop of dragoons, was surprised by Eroles, at the head of over 3,000 somatenes, at Villaseca. Lafosse managed to reach Tarragona, with only twenty-two of his dragoons, but his battalion, after resisting for several hours in the village, was forced to surrender. Eroles took nearly 600 prisoners, and left over 200 French troops dead. Commodore Edward Codrington, then commanding a squadron in the Mediterranean Sea charged with harrying French shipping, was present at the combat, having come on shore to confer with Eroles, with whom he often collaborated, regarding an action against Tarragona. The Spanish force managed to liberate two Royal Navy captains taken prisoner by Lafosse's men after having landed at Cape Salou the previous day.
20 January 1812	Capture of Dénia	Dénia, Province of Alicante	Manoeuvres (French)	Dénia was an important centre of distribution for stores and munitions of war, and its fortifications had been newly repaired during Blake's time at Valencia. However, following Blake's surrender at Valencia, earlier that month, Mahy withdrew his garrison, neglecting to remove its magazines. On entering Dénia, Harispe found sixty guns mounted on its walls, plus forty small merchant vessels in the harbour, some of them laden with stores. As well as garrisoning the place, the French fitted out some of the vessels as privateers. Mahy's carelessness in abandoning these resources was among the reasons he was removed from command by the Cadiz Regency.
20 January 1812 – 2 February 1812	Siege of Peniscola	Peniscola, Valencia, Valencia	French victory	Garrisoned by 1,000 veteran Spanish troops, under Garcia Navarro, the impregnable fortress at Peniscola, sitting atop a rock connected with the mainland by a narrow sand-spit 250 yards long, known as 'the little Gibraltar', was one of the strongest places in all Spain, and was regularly revictualled by Spanish and British vessels from Alicante, Cartagena, and the Balearic Isles. Suchet ordered Severoli, with two Italian and two French battalions, to besiege the place and on the 31st work began to erect five batteries. On February 2, Garcia Navarro capitulated under unusually favourable terms. (Note: In the letter he sent to Suchet along with the capitulation, he stated, "To-day I see that to render Spain less unhappy it is necessary for us all to unite under the King [Joseph], and I make my offer to serve him with the same enthusiasm. Your excellency may be quite sure of me—I surrender a fortress fully provisioned and capable of a long defence—which is the best guarantee of the sincerity of my promise." (Oman, 1914: p. 89.)) Having surrendered the place to the French troops, he was then appointed governor of the same place by the French.
24 January 1812	Battle of Altafulla	Tarragona, Catalonia	French victory	
16 March 1812 – 6 April 1812	Siege of Badajoz	Badajoz, Extremadura	Allied victory	Having breached the city walls at great loss, Wellington's troops went on a rampage of rape and pillage for three days, massacring hundreds of civilians before being brought to order.
3 April 1812	Combat at Fuente del Maestre	Fuente del Maestre, Badajoz, Extremadura	Anglo-Portuguese victory	Lt Col Abercromby led a column of 2nd Hussars and 14th Portuguese Cavalry that routed a body of around 100 French dragoons.
9 April 1812	Second battle of Arlabán	Mountain pass between Gipuzkoa and Álava	Spanish victory	Also referred to as the Second Surprise of Arlabán to distinguish it from the First Surprise of Arlabán (May 1811).
11 April 1812	Battle of Villagarcia (also known as the Battle of Llerena)	Badajoz, Extremadura	British victory	
18–19 May 1812	Battle of Almaraz	Cáceres, Extremadura	Allied victory	Some 9,000 Allied troops under Rowland Hill destroyed the pontoon bridge the French had built at Almaraz in 1811. Hill then proceeded to repair the bridge at Alcantara, thereby allowing Wellington to move towards Salamanca. The original bridge at Almaraz, dating from 1552, had been partially destroyed in January 1809 by the Spanish General Juan de Henestrosa, the vanguard of General Gregorio de la Cuesta's army. The following month, it had suffered further damage when another part of it collapsed, killing 26 soldiers, including the engineer officer.
31 May 1812	Battle of Bornos	Cádiz, Andalusia	French victory	
11 June 1812	Battle of Maguilla	Badajoz, Extremadura	French victory	
13–17 June 1812	Ciudad Rodrigo – Salamanca	Castile-León	Manoeuvres (British)	Wellington's troops moved from their cantonments towards Salamanca. The French troops abandoned the city and Wellington entered on the 17th. (See 17 June 1812, below.)
17 June 1812	La Coruña	North of Spain: Cantabria, Basque Country and Navarre	Manoeuvres (British)	Popham sailed from Corunna with his fleet comprising two line of battleships, five frigates, two sloops, and one or two smaller vessels, transporting two battalions of marines, a company of artillery, and several thousand small-arms for the guerrilleros. Popham also carried credentials from Castaños, as captain-general of Galicia, for Mendizábal, the officer liaising with the bands of Cantabria and Biscay, including Porlier's brigades in the Eastern Asturias, and Longa's in Cantabria (both of which were considered part of the regular army) as well as the guerrilleros of el Pastor in Guipuzcoa, Renovales in Biscay, el Cura Merino, and others.
17–27 June 1812	Siege of the Salamanca forts	Salamanca, Castile-León	Allied victory	(See 13 June 1812, above.)
21–22 June 1812	Lequeitio: storming of defences: a fort and a fortified convent	Basque Country	Anglo-Spanish victory	Popham landed a 24-pounder and marines, which met up with El Pastor's guerrillas and breached the fort. When the gun was brought up against the fortified convent, the commander surrendered without fighting. 290 prisoners were taken. Popham then sailed off to Bermeo and Plencia, both of which the French evacuated, leaving behind provisions and unspiked guns.
29 June – 19 August 1812	Astorga, Second siege of	León, Castile-León	Spanish victory	Spanish troops liberate Astorga, in French hands since the first Siege of Astorga in 1810.
6–8 July 1812	Castro Urdiales	Cantabria (on the Bay of Biscay)	Anglo-Spanish victory	Popham was joined by Longa's brigade and drove off a small French column that had come to raise the siege. The governor of Castro surrendered with some 150 men, and 20 guns on his walls. Popham decided to use its castle as a temporary base, and garrisoned it with some of his marines.
21 July 1812	Battle of Castalla	Alicante, Valencia	French victory	
22 July 1812	Battle of Salamanca	Salamanca, Castile and León	Decisive Allied victory	Also known as the Battle of Arapiles, for the name of the nearby village, Arapiles, which in turn takes its name from the two low, flat-topped hills, Arapil Chico (Lesser Arapile) and Arapil Grande (Greater Arapile), over and around which part of the battle took place. Having secured the Portuguese-Spanish frontier, Wellington was able to advance further into Spain. At Salamanca, his Allied army defeated a larger French force under Marshal Marmont.
22 July – 2 August 1812	Santander (Capture of)	Santander, Spain, Cantabria	Anglo-Spanish victory	Oman considered the capture of Santander "the most important event that had happened on the north coast of Spain since 1809", (Note: "... the most important event that had happened on the north coast of Spain since 1809", for it gave the squadron of Popham possession of the sole really good harbor—open to the largest ships, and safe at all times of the year—which lies between Ferrol and the French frontier". (Oman 1914, p. 555.)) Popham's initial attack, coordinated with Mendizábal and one of Porlier's lieutenants, Campillo, failed. However, the French governor, Dubreton, broke out of the place with his 1,600 men on the night of the 2nd-3rd, leaving eighteen spiked guns.
23 July 1812	Battle of Garcia Hernandez	Salamanca, Castile and León	Anglo-German victory	
31 July 1812	Sicily – Palamos	Catalonia	Manoeuvres (Allied)	Wellington had suggested that an attack on the Catalonian coast would, by creating a diversion, prevent Suchet from intervening in the west. Maitland, sent by Lord William Bentinck to Spain, with three British, two German battalions plus several other foreign units and, having picked up some Spanish troops on the way, arrived off Palamos, on the Catalan coast with some ten thousand men in total, eventually landing further south. (Note: The British government had told Wellington that the force would be entirely at his disposal. However, Maitland, who was under Bentinck's orders, had been told by his commander that he was not part of the army of Spain and must be ready to return to Sicily at the first sign of trouble there. (Yonge.)) Although the force achieved little in military terms, it did have the desired effect as it was clear that Suchet had been aware of the rumour of troops coming from Sicily and of the existence of the transports at Alicante and Majorca.
11 August 1812	Battle of Majadahonda	New Castile (now Community of Madrid)		
14 August 1812	Surrender of the French garrison at the Citadel of Madrid	Parque del Buen Retiro, Madrid, Madrid	Allied victory	King Joseph having evacuated Madrid on the 10th, General Lafon-Blaniac surrenders his 2,000-strong garrison. Following his victory at Salamanca the previous month, Wellington was able to liberate Madrid, before moving north to besiege Burgos, the logistical hub for all reinforcements and supplies for the French armies in Spain. (See 19 September 1812, below.)
25 August 1812	Cádiz (Siege of ends)	Cádiz, Andalusia	Manoeuvres (French)	French troops withdrew from Cádiz. Cádiz would be the only city in continental Europe to survive a siege by Napoleon: thirty-one months—from 5 February 1810 to 25 August 1812.
19 September – 21 October 1812	Siege of Burgos	Burgos, Castile and León	French victory	Wellington had to abandon the siege of Burgos and retreat back into Portugal once again due to the risk of being encircled by the French forces which, following Wellington's victory at Salamanca, had themselves been forced to retreat from Andalusia in the south to avoid being cut off, but still had enough troops in north and eastern Spain to launch a major counter-offensive.
23 October 1812	Battle of Venta del Pozo	Palencia, Castile and León	Indecisive; French tactical victory	Also known as the Battle of Villodrigo.
25–29 October 1812	Battle of Tordesillas	Valladolid, Castile and León	French victory	Also known as the Battle of Villamuriel or Battle of Palencia.

=== 1813 ===
Date	Event	Province/region (modern)	Outcome	Notes
13 April 1813	Battle of Castalla	Alicante, Valencia	Anglo-Spanish victory	
2 June 1813	Battle of Morales	Zamora, Castile and León		
3–11 June 1813	Second siege of Tarragona	Tarragona, Catalonia	French victory	
18 June 1813	Battle of San Millan-Osma	San Millan, Burgos, Castile and León / Osma, Álava, Basque Country	Allied victory	Mountain pass northwest of Miranda del Ebro, just off the Burgos–Bilbao road.
21 June 1813	Battle of Vitoria	Álava, Basque Country	Allied victory (decisive)	Led to the abdication of Napoleon's brother, Joseph Bonaparte, King of Spain, 11 December 1813. Beethoven's Op. 91, "Wellingtons Sieg oder die Schlacht bei Vittoria", completed in the first week of October 1813, commemorates the victory. Originally composed for the panharmonicon, it was first performed with Beethoven himself conducting, together with the premiere of his Symphony No. 7.
26 June 1813	Battle of Tolosa	Gipuzkoa, Basque Country	Allied victory (decisive)	Led to the abdication of Napoleon's brother, Joseph Bonaparte, King of Spain, 11 December 1813. Beethoven's Op. 91, "Wellingtons Sieg oder die Schlacht bei Vittoria", completed in the first week of October 1813, commemorates the victory. Originally composed for the panharmonicon, it was first performed with Beethoven himself conducting, together with the premiere of his Symphony No. 7.
26 June – 31 October 1813	Siege of Pamplona	Pamplona, Navarre	Allied victory	
7–25 July 1813	First siege of San Sebastián	Province of Gipuzkoa, Basque Country	French victory	Although referred to as one siege, there were in fact two separate sieges. See Second siege of San Sebastián (8 August – 8 September 1813), below.
25 July 1813 – 1 August 1813	Battle of the Pyrenees		Allied victory	The Battle of the Pyrenees was large-scale offensive, involving several battles, launched by Marshal Soult to relieve the French garrisons under siege at Pamplona and San Sebastián. Following his defeat at Battle of Sorauren at the end of the month, Soult ordered the retreat towards France, having decided it would be impossible to relieve Pamplona.
25 July 1813	Battle of Roncesvalles	Roncevaux Pass, Spain	French victory	Mountain pass at 1,057 m (3,468 ft) on the Spanish side of the Pyrenees near the border with France. A battle included in the Battle of the Pyrenees.
25 July 1813	Battle of Maya	Navarre	French victory	Mountain pass on the Spanish side of the Pyrenees near the border with France. A battle included in the Battle of the Pyrenees.
27 July – 1 August 1813	Battle of Sorauren	Navarre	Allied victory	A battle included in the Battle of the Pyrenees. Soult ordered the retreat towards France, having decided it would be impossible to relieve Pamplona. A battle included in the Battle of the Pyrenees.
30 July 1813	Combat of Beunza	Navarre		During the fighting at Sorauren, Hill's 2nd Division and Costa's Brigade were engaged 25 km to the northwest, fighting a French corps at Beunza, near Atez.
8 August – 8 September 1813	Second siege of San Sebastián	Province of Gipuzkoa, Basque Country	Anglo-Portuguese victory	Although referred to as one siege, there were in fact two separate sieges. See First siege of San Sebastián (7–25 July 1813), above.
31 August 1813	Battle of San Marcial	Near Irun, Basque Country	Spanish victory	
12–13 September 1813	Battle of Ordal	Defile of Ordal and Vilafranca del Penedès, Barcelona	French victory	
7 October 1813	Battle of the Bidassoa		Allied victory (tactical)	Also known as the Battle of Larrun.
9 November 1813	Battle of Nivelle	Pyrénées-Atlantiques, France	Allied victory	Most of Spain had been liberated, except for the French garrison at Pamplona and the east coast. Soult had fortified the Nivelle river for 35 km, inland from its estuary, and was defending it with 60,000 troops. Wellington had 82,000 troops divided into fifteen divisions. Major General Carlos Lecor, commanding the 7th Division, was the first Portuguese officer to command a division of British troops.
8 December 1813	Treaty of Valençay	Château de Valençay, Indre, France	Treaty	Napoleon, wishing to reestablish an alliance with Spain, intended the Treaty as the preliminary to a full peace treaty between France and Spain, the agreement providing for the withdrawal of French troops from Spain, and restoration of Ferdinand VII of Spain. The Cortes of Cádiz duly repudiated the treaty once Ferdinand had reached the safety of Madrid.
9–13 December 1813	Battle of the Nive	Pyrénées-Atlantiques, France	Allied victory	
11 December 1813	Abdication of Joseph Bonaparte, King of Spain		Abdication	

=== 1814 ===
Date	Event	Province/region (modern)	Outcome	Notes
15 February 1814	Battle of Garris	Pyrénées-Atlantiques, France	Allied victory	Also known as the Battle of Saint-Palais.
27 February 1814	Battle of Orthez	Pyrénées-Atlantiques, France	Anglo-Portuguese victory	
6 April 1814	Abdication of Napoleon Bonaparte		Abdication	
10 April 1814	Battle of Toulouse	Haute-Garonne, France	Allied victory	One of the last battles of the Peninsular War. That afternoon, the official word of Napoleon's abdication and the end of the war reached Wellington. Soult agreed to an armistice on 17 April.
14 April 1814	Battle of Bayonne	Bayonne, France	Allied victory	Although there were still isolated incidents, especially in Catalonia, Bayonne was the last major battle of the Peninsular War.
28 May 1814	Surrender of Barcelona	Barcelona, Catalonia	Surrender	The French garrison at Barcelona surrenders.
4 June 1814	Surrender of Sant Ferran Castle	Figueres, Catalonia	Surrender	The last French garrison in Spain surrenders.

== See also ==
- Peninsular War
- A History of the Peninsular War by Charles Oman (7 volumes)
- List of French generals of the Peninsular War
- List of Spanish generals of the Peninsular War
- List of Portuguese generals of the Peninsular War
