= Vicente Bertrán de Lis =

Spanish banker and politician (1772–1857)

- Born: 1772; Valencia
- Died: 2 January 1857 (aged 84–85); Madrid
- Occupation: Banker

Vicente Bertrán de Lis Thomas (1772–1857) was a Spanish banker and politician.

== Biography ==
=== Peninsular War ===
By April 1808, following the Tumult of Aranjuez in March and before the Dos de Mayo Uprising in Madrid, Bertrán de Lis and his brother Manuel, had recruited and armed over 500 men, at eight reales a day, for the service of the new king, Ferdinand VII, whom he went to see personally to congratulate him on gaining the throne.

Following the Madrid uprising, the governor of Valencia, Miguel de Saavedra, Baron Albalat was killed by the mob and Valencia acknowledged Fernando as King of Spain on 23 May 1808. Bertrán de Lis and his brothers organised the storming of the citadel, capturing its French garrison. Vicente Bertrán de Lis was then elected member of the first Junta de Valencia.

Early the following month, when Canon Baltasar Calvo instigated the massacre of 300–400 French citizens, half of whom were inside the city's citadel, where the local authorities were protecting them against popular reprisals following the killings in Madrid, (Note: After having declared himself the only representative of King Ferdinand and was about to issue orders for dismissing the captain-general, Conde de Cervellon, and dissolving the Junta, Calvo was arrested, tried as a traitor and executed. Some two hundred of his followers were also executed and their bodies exposed in public. (Southey, 1823.)) Bertrán de Lis and his brothers recruited and paid for a local force to maintain order in the city.

Bertrán de Lis was arrested in 1809, along with Canga Argüelles, and deported to Ibiza for five months. The latter, on being appointed minister of finance in 1811, rewarded Bertrán de Lis with a contract for supplying the Spanish army.

At the end of the war, Bertrán de Lis was again arrested for being a liberal, although he was finally released following the intervention of Ferdinand VII.

=== Later career ===
By June 1820, Bertrán de Lis had become the Rothschild agent in Spain.

With his employee, Juan Álvarez Mendizábal, (Note: Juan Álvarez Mendizábal would go on to serve briefly as prime minister (1835–1836), promulgating the set of decrees known as the Ecclesiastical confiscations of Mendizábal. Mendizábal also served as minister of finance for different governments both before and after having held office himself.) acting as his agent, Bertrán de Lis financed and coordinated Rafael del Riego's military uprising in 1820. Despite General Elío having had Bertrán de Lis's son, Félix, executed in 1819 for his involvement in Colonel Valdés's pronunciamiento in Cádiz, when Elío was captured in Valencia, Bertrán de Lis prevented the mob from lynching him and insisted on a court martial, which finally condemned the former captain general of Valencia to the garrote.

With the return of absolutism, Bertrán de Lis was forced to flee to Belgium and from there went to Paris. He returned to Spain following the death of Ferdinand VII.

He was elected to Congreso for Valencia in 1836. In 1837, another son, José, died as a prisoner of the Carlists in Cartagena. In 1843, Bertrán de Lis was elected President (speaker) of the Congress of Deputies. In 1847 he was appointed senator for life.

He was minister of Foreign Affairs (ministro de Estado) and acting minister for the Navy in 1850–1851 and minister of the Interior (ministro de la Gobernación) and acting minister of Foreign Affairs in 1851–1852.
