= Battle of Mansilla =

1808 battle of the Peninsular War

- Part of Peninsular War
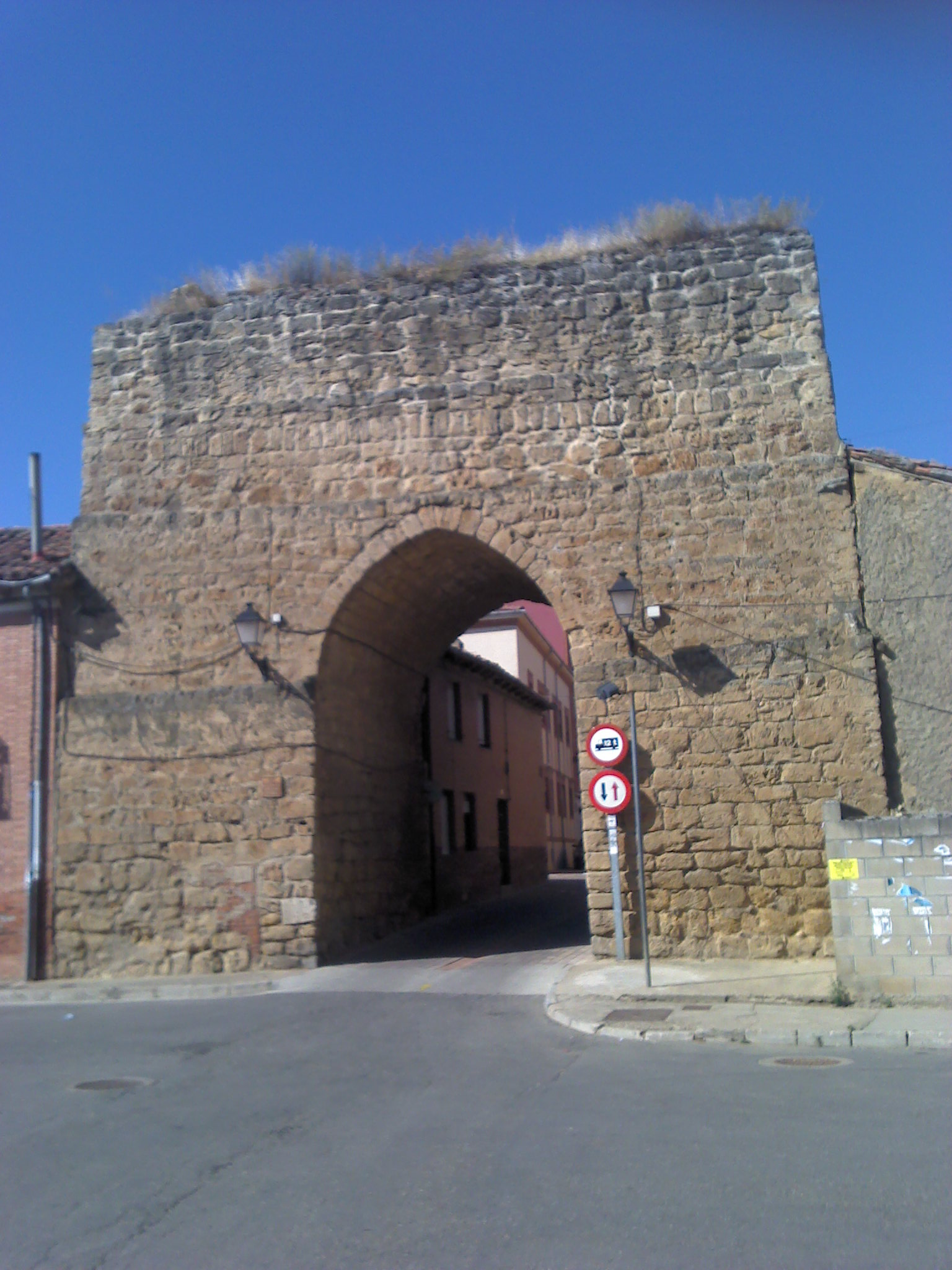
- Concepción Gate, Mansilla de las Mulas
Date	30 December 1808
Location	Mansilla de las Mulas, Spain 42°30′N 5°25′W
Result	French victory

Belligerents
(France) First French Empire	Bourbon Spain

Commanders and leaders
(France) Marshal Soult (France) Jean Franceschi	(Spain) Marquis La Romana (Spain) General Martinengo

Strength
2,200	3,000, 2 guns

Casualties and losses
Light	Over 1,500, 2 guns

Peninsular War: Napoleon's invasion
current battle

In the Battle of Mansilla or Battle of Mansilla de las Mulas on 30 December 1808 an Imperial French corps led by Nicolas Soult caught up with a Spanish corps commanded by Pedro Caro, 3rd Marquis of la Romana. Soult's cavalry under Jean Baptiste Marie Franceschi-Delonne overran la Romana's rear guard led by General Martinengo. Mansilla de las Mulas is a town located 17 kilometres (11 mi) southeast of León, Spain. The combat occurred during the Peninsular War, part of the Napoleonic Wars.

La Romana's Spanish corps cooperated with Sir John Moore's British army in its advance into northern Spain and in its subsequent retreat to the northwest. At Mansilla de las Mulas on the Esla River, the Spanish commander posted Martinengo's division to hold off Soult's pursuing French corps. The rear guard commander unwisely drew up his soldiers with the bridge at their backs. Franceschi's cavalry charged and cut the Spanish formation to pieces. Half of the rear guard were trapped against the river and forced to surrender, others were cut down by Imperial French sabers. La Romana abandoned León the following day. The next major action in the area was the Battle of Corunna on 16 January 1809.

== Background ==
The Corunna campaign started with the Battle of Cardedeu.

== Battle ==
Franceschi's 2,200 horsemen included the French 8th Dragoon Regiment, the 22nd and 1st Provisional Chasseurs a Cheval Regiments, and the Hanoverian Chasseurs. The 3,000 men and two cannons of Martinengo's 2nd Division of the Army of Galicia belonged to a mix of regular and militia battalions. The regular contingent was made up of two battalions each of the Naples and Navarra Infantry Regiments, two squadrons of the Reina Cavalry Regiment, and one squadron of the Montesa Cavalry Regiment. The Pontevedra and Segovia were militia units and the Volunteers of Victory was a newly recruited unit. One company of sappers was also present.

The Spanish lost 1,500 prisoners in addition to "some hundreds" killed and wounded. The French cavalry, whose losses were described as light, also captured two cannons and two colors from their enemies. The next day, la Romana left León to the French along with hospitals crowded with 2,000 diseased or wounded Spanish soldiers.

== Aftermath ==
The Corunna campaign proceeded with the Battle of Cacabelos.

== See also ==
- Timeline of the Peninsular War

== Bibliography ==
- Esdaile, Charles J. (2003). The Peninsular War. Palgrave MacMillan. ISBN 9781403962317.
- Smith, Digby (1998). The Napoleonic Wars Data Book. London: Greenhill. ISBN 1-85367-276-9.
