= Citadel of Pamplona =

Coordinates: 42.8122°N 1.6493°W

The Citadel of Pamplona
- Iruñeko Zitadela
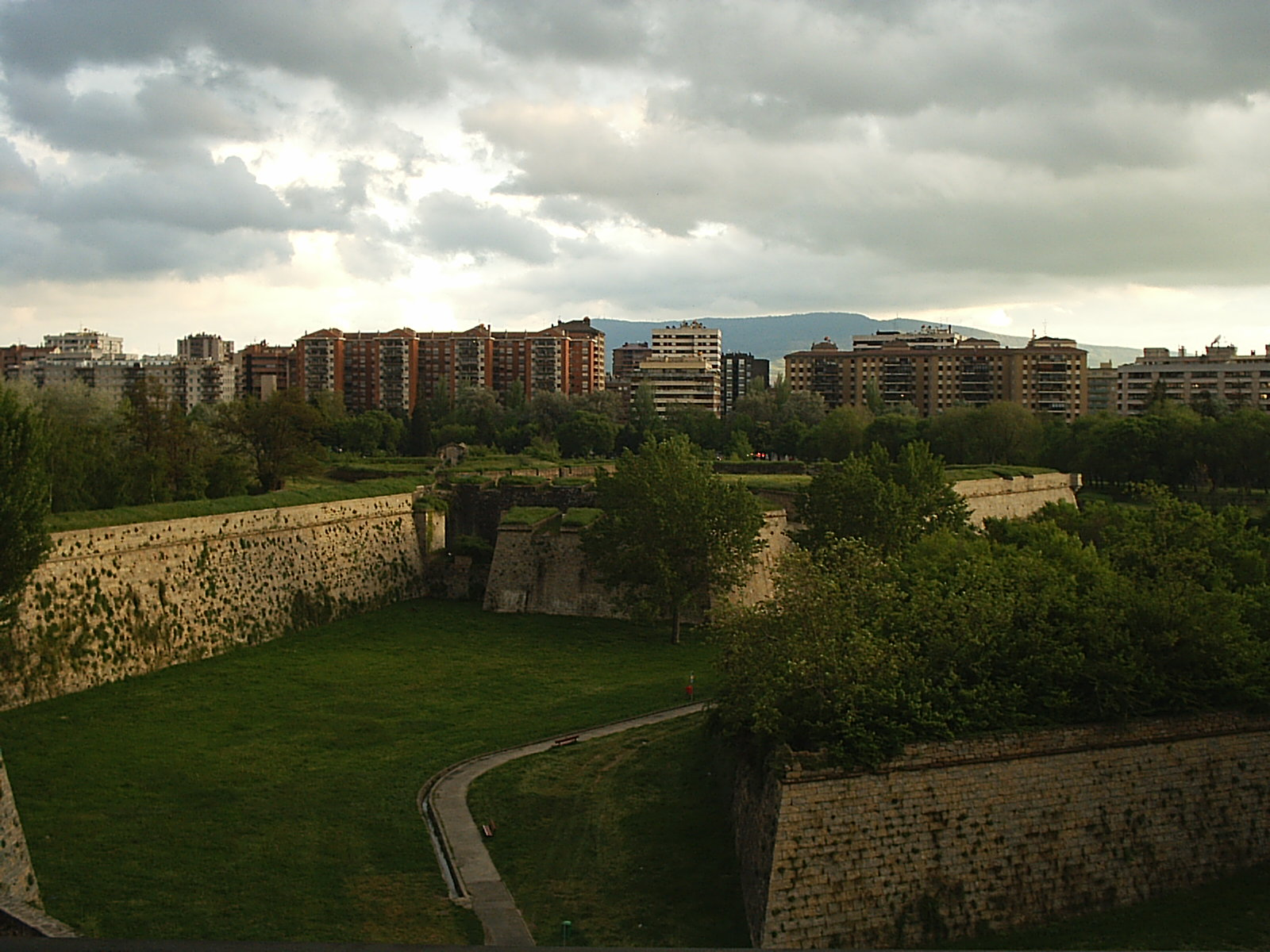
- Interactive map of The Citadel of Pamplona
- Alternative names: The New Castle

General information
- Type: fort
- Architectural style: Renaissance
- Location: Avenida del Paz, Pamplona, Navarre

Technical details
- Floor area: 280.000 m^{2}

Design and construction
- Structural engineer: Giacomo Palearo

Renovating team
- Structural engineer: Vespasiano Gonzaga y Colonna

Website
- www.pamplona.es

The Citadel of Pamplona, also known as the New Castle (in Basque, Iruñeko zitadela; in Spanish, Ciudadela de Pamplona), is a Renaissance-era military bastion fort constructed between the 16th and 17th centuries in the city of Pamplona, the capital of the Navarre community in Spain. A large part of the fort remains intact and is currently incorporated into a public park, where cultural activities are held in its buildings.

In 2015, as part of UNESCO's approval process for the further development of the Camino de Santiago in Spain (The Camino de Santiago de Compostela: The French Camino and the Caminos in the North of Spain), Spain submitted documentation entitled Retrospective Inventory – Associated Components. In this inventory, the Citadel of Pamplona is listed as component number 180.

== Construction ==
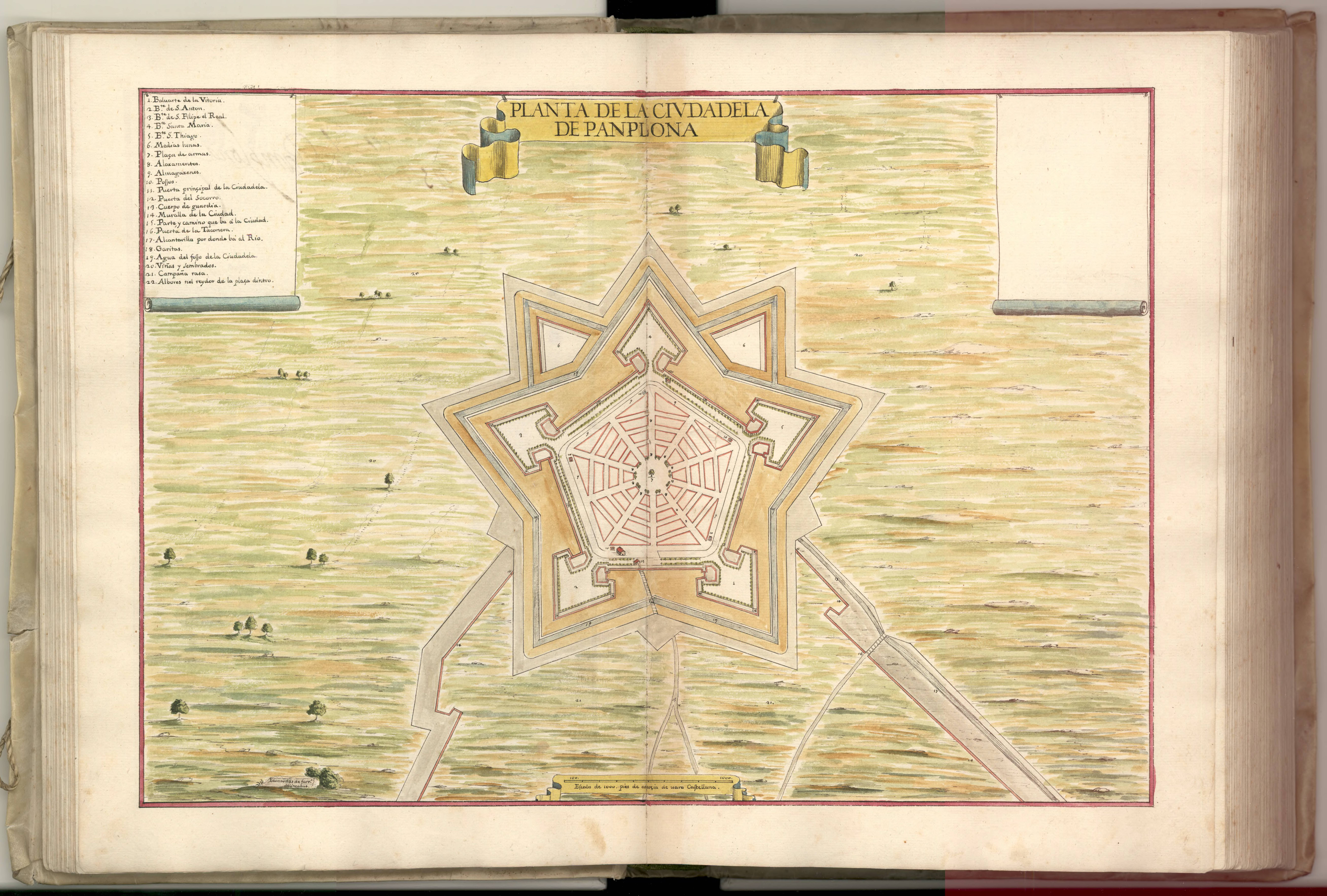
Hand-drawn map of the Citadel of Pamplona from 1699 by Leonardus de Ferrarys.

Philip II ordered the construction of the citadel in 1571 as part of a broader programme to renovate and reinforce the city walls. The project was designed by the military engineer Giacomo Palearo, known as "el Fratin", with the involvement of the viceroy of Navarre, Vespasiano Gonzaga y Colonna. The resulting defensive system followed the principles of Italian Renaissance military theory, which had recently been applied in Antwerp in the construction of its citadel by Francesco Paciotto, who also worked on fortifications in Turin.

The citadel was designed as a five-pointed star-shaped enclosure, allowing all possible angles of attack to be covered from each bastion. Two of the points were oriented towards the interior of the city in order to control that area. Contemporary documents indicate that in 1569 the engineer Antonelli informed Philip II that Pamplona required a main fortress both to protect it from external threats and to ensure internal control. This approach reflected the political context following the conquest of the Kingdom of Navarre, which had been accompanied by attempts at reconquest with active local participation. According to Alicia Cámara, in her work Muraria, the citadel "should be understood as a means of dominating a city from which rebellion could be expected", a view echoed by the Venetian ambassador Contarini, who reported widespread hostility towards Spanish rule and support for the return of the Navarrese king Juan de Albret.

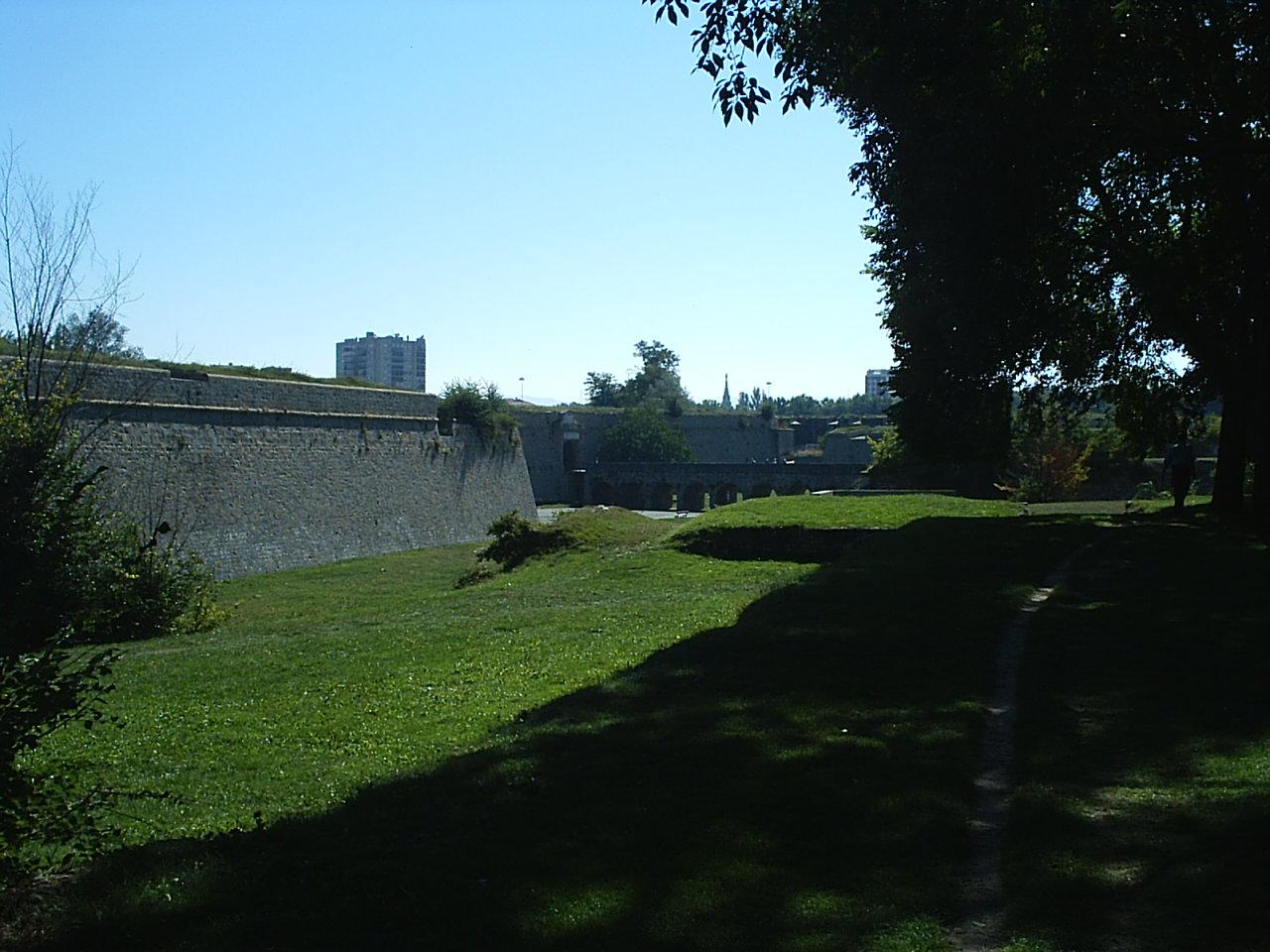
The Citadel of Pamplona, viewed from the park of Vuelta del Castillo

The bastions of the citadel are named San Antón, El Real, Santa María, Santiago, and Victoria.

Construction was completed in 1645. The fortifications were subsequently strengthened with the addition of external ravelins, known as "half-moons", in 1685 and again during the first half of the 18th century, further enhancing the defensive system.

These later reinforcements were based on a project by Juan de Ledesma and followed the principles of the poliorcetic system associated with Vauban, the military engineer who modernised fortification design during the reign of Louis XIV. Two half-moons were constructed between the bastions of Santiago and Victoria, facing the Taconera gate, and between San Antón and El Real, facing the San Nicolás gate. Additional defensive works were also built along the stretches between the bastions of Santiago, Santa María, and El Real, enclosing them on both fronts and increasing their defensive capacity.

== The strength of the citadel ==
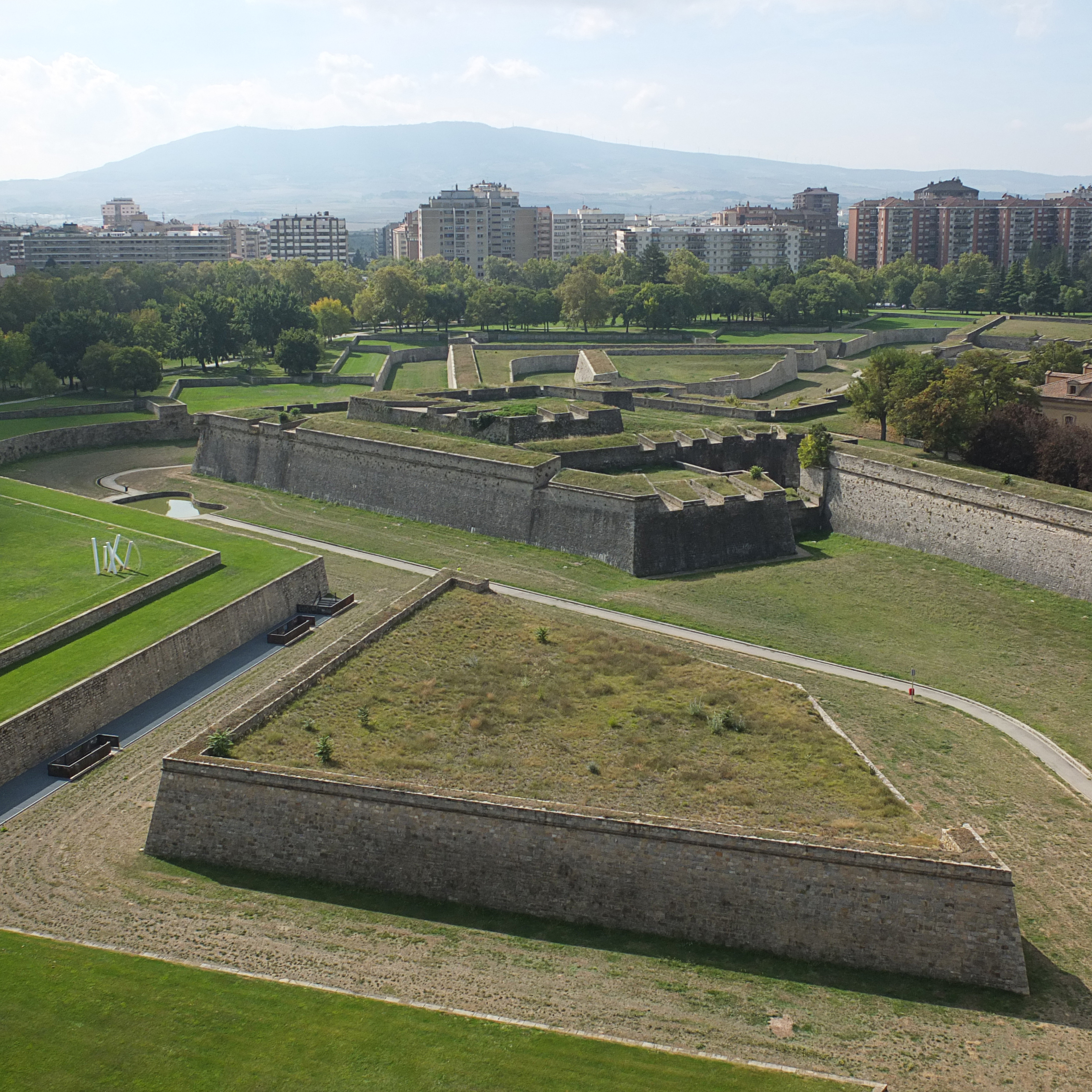
View of the Citadel of Pamplona

The Citadel of Pamplona has not been subjected to many major defensive assaults. Although it was rarely besieged, it was captured on several occasions. One of the most significant events occurred during the Napoleonic Wars. On February 16, 1808, French troops under the command of General D'Armagnac took control of the city. Under the terms of the Treaty of Fontainebleau with King Charles IV, French forces were permitted to cross the Iberian Peninsula in preparation for the invasion of Portugal.

French troops first entered Pamplona on February 9, 1808, through the San Nicolás gate, located in what is now the Segundo Ensanche district, at the junction of Calle Cortes de Navarra and Calle San Ignacio. Officers were accommodated in noble residences, while up to 4,000 soldiers were quartered throughout the city. Tensions escalated, culminating in a street altercation in which a French soldier was killed. In response to the increasingly hostile situation, Napoléon ordered D'Armagnac to seize the city. Taking advantage of a snowstorm on February 16, 1808, French soldiers approached the citadel while feigning snowball games in front of the defenders. Once close, they produced weapons concealed in their clothing and succeeded in entering and occupying the citadel.

Comparable stratagems were later employed in other seizures during the Napoleonic period, including the capture of the Citadel of Barcelona and Montjuïc Castle by Duhesme on February 28, the citadel of Figueres by Colonel Piat, and the Mota Castle of San Sebastián.

In 1823, liberal forces held the citadel for five months against the army of the Hundred Thousand Sons of St. Louis. Rather than storming the fortress, the attacking army initially sought to contain the garrison and prevent its escape while operations continued elsewhere in the peninsula to restore absolute monarchy. On September 3, bombardment of the city of Pamplona began, intensifying on September 16. Following this renewed shelling, the defenders surrendered.

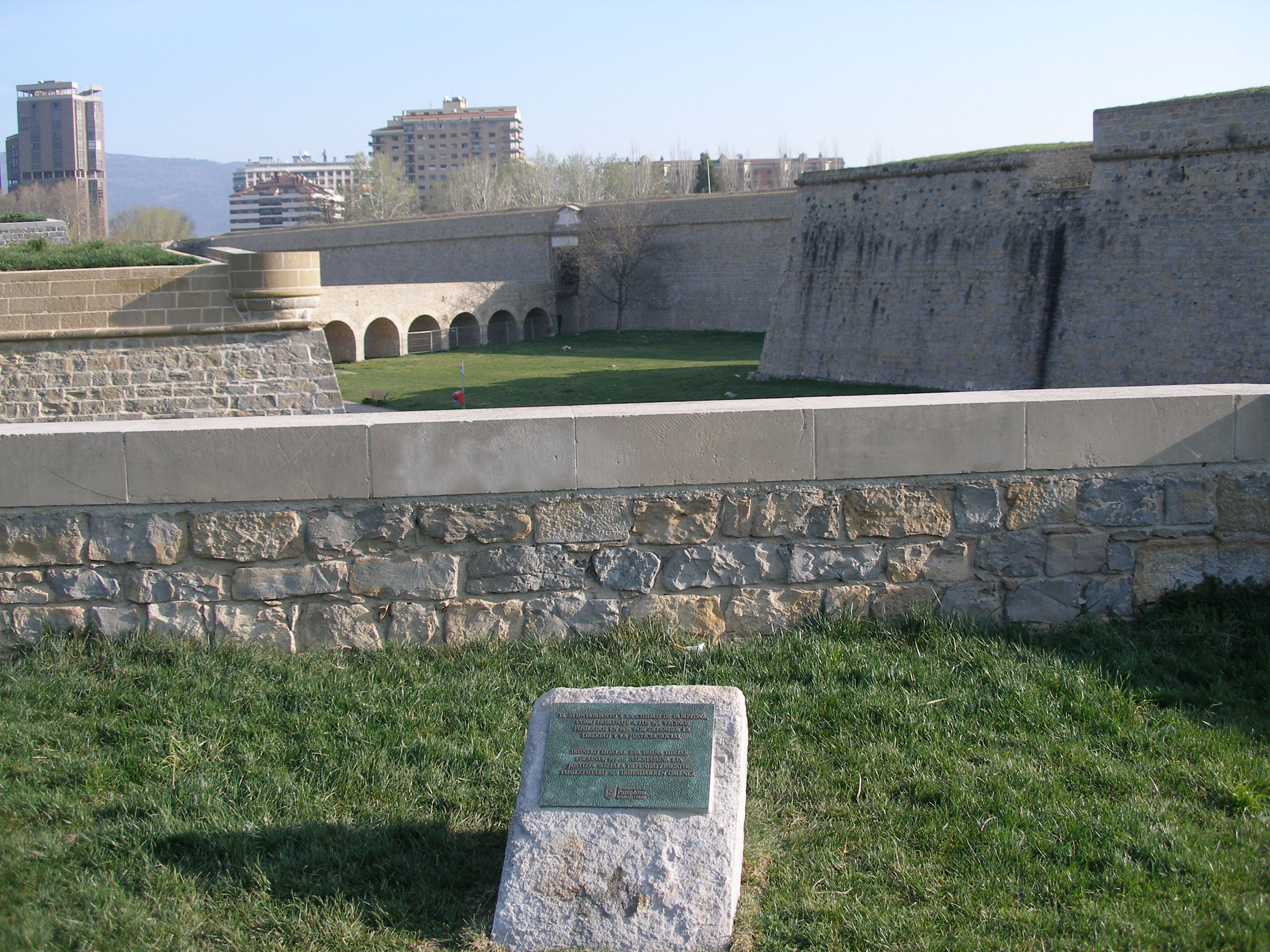
Monolith placed in March 2012 in tribute to those executed in Pamplona during the Spanish Civil War

During the Spanish Civil War, the Nationalist forces carried out numerous executions of members and supporters of the Republican side at the Socorro Gate, as part of the broader repression in Navarre. A commemorative plaque was installed in 2007 and was replaced in March 2012 by a monolith bearing the same text, located in the area of the moat near the Socorro Gate. The inscription, in Spanish and Basque, reads:

"The City Council and the city of Pamplona, in tribute to the 298 residents shot in 1936 for defending freedom and social justice."

== The citadel today ==
In 1964, the Citadel of Pamplona ceased to be used for military purposes. The former military area was subsequently converted into a public park, known in Spanish as La Planta de la Ciudadela, with the historic military buildings adapted for cultural and civic activities.

Map of the Citadel of Pamplona

Several buildings located within the interior of the park have been preserved. These historic military structures were maintained after the city assumed ownership of the fortified enclosure surrounding the park. The preserved buildings include:

- The ammunition depot, built in 1694 by Torelli.
- The warehouse for mixed goods, renovated by Ignacio Sala in 1720.
- The artillery hall, designed in 1725 by the military engineer Jorge Próspero Verboom, who also designed the Citadel of Barcelona.

The park is currently located in the centre of the city and is surrounded on all sides by another major green space in Pamplona known as Vuelta del Castillo. This area has remained the city's largest continuous green zone over time, as no military buildings were constructed there.

Following the incorporation of the former military grounds into the urban fabric, the combined area of the Citadel park and its surrounding green spaces totals 275,840 m², a designation made official on July 23, 1966. Various proposals were put forward regarding the future use of the area. To determine public opinion, a citywide consultation was conducted in 1971. The outcome favoured the preservation of the military park and adjacent land, including the restored historic buildings and green areas, with regular maintenance. These spaces were identified as among the most valued areas of the city and were to remain largely free from new construction, with use limited to small-scale historical recreations or sporting activities.

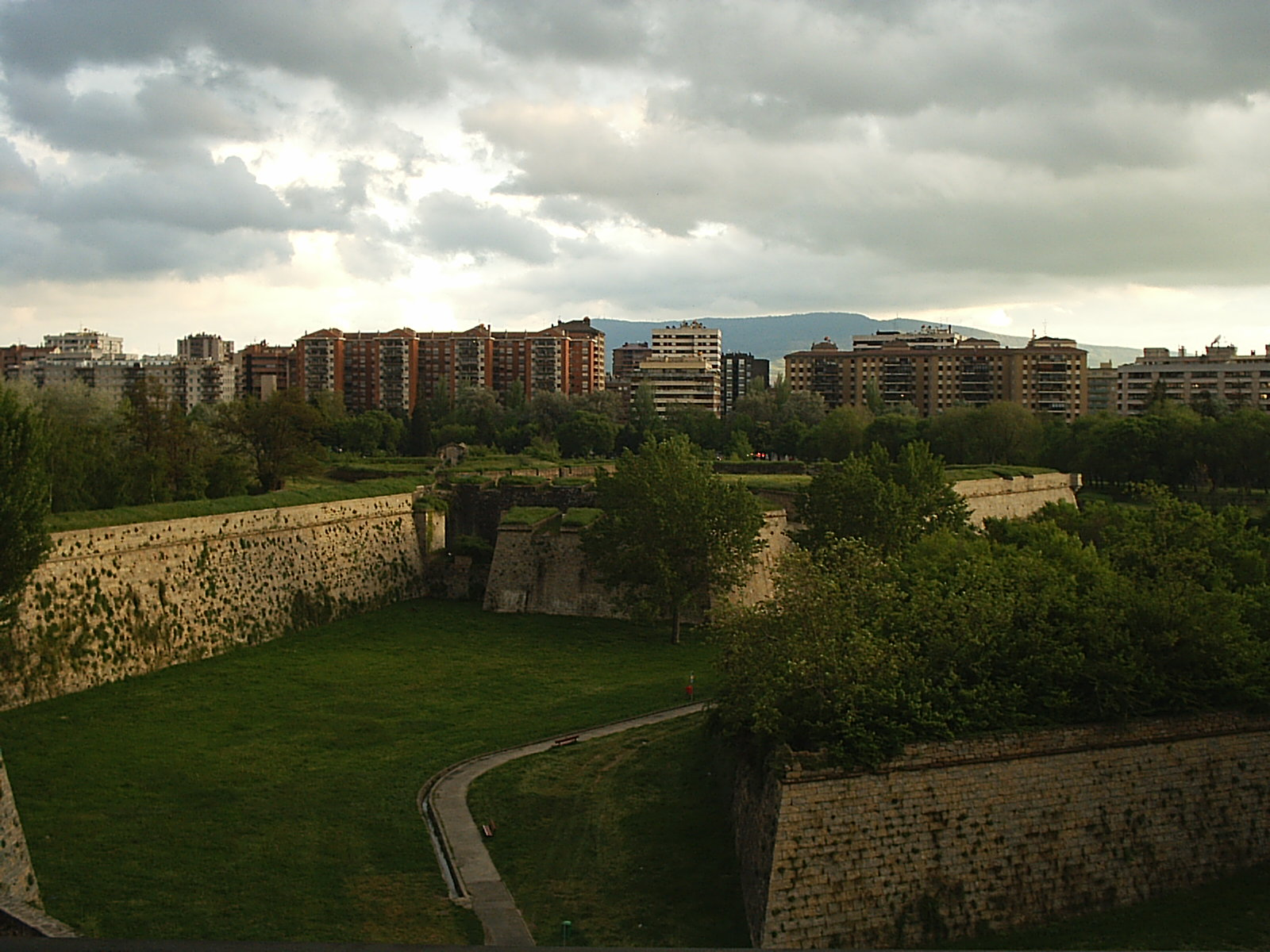
The Stronghold of Santiago

In 1972, the city council decided to retain the old artillery building in its original location, near Yanguas y Miranda Street at the eastern end of the Citadel, in order to preserve the integrity of the surrounding fortifications. In December 1972, the council requested that the Spanish government declare the military park a Natural Historic-Artistic Monument. This designation was granted the following year by Decree 332, on February 8, 1973.

The Citadel was originally designed as a regular five-pointed star. However, in the late 19th century and early 20th century, the strongholds of San Antón and Victoria—both oriented towards the city centre—were partially demolished to facilitate the first residential expansion of Pamplona. Subsequent urban developments, including new housing, barracks outside the former city walls, and the construction of Avenida del Ejército in 1971, contributed to the citadel's current configuration.

The Parliament of Navarre and the Auditorium of Navarre were built on the remains of the San Antón stronghold. In November 2007, construction of the new Pamplona bus station was completed. The station was built underground beneath a glacis, adjacent to the Citadel.

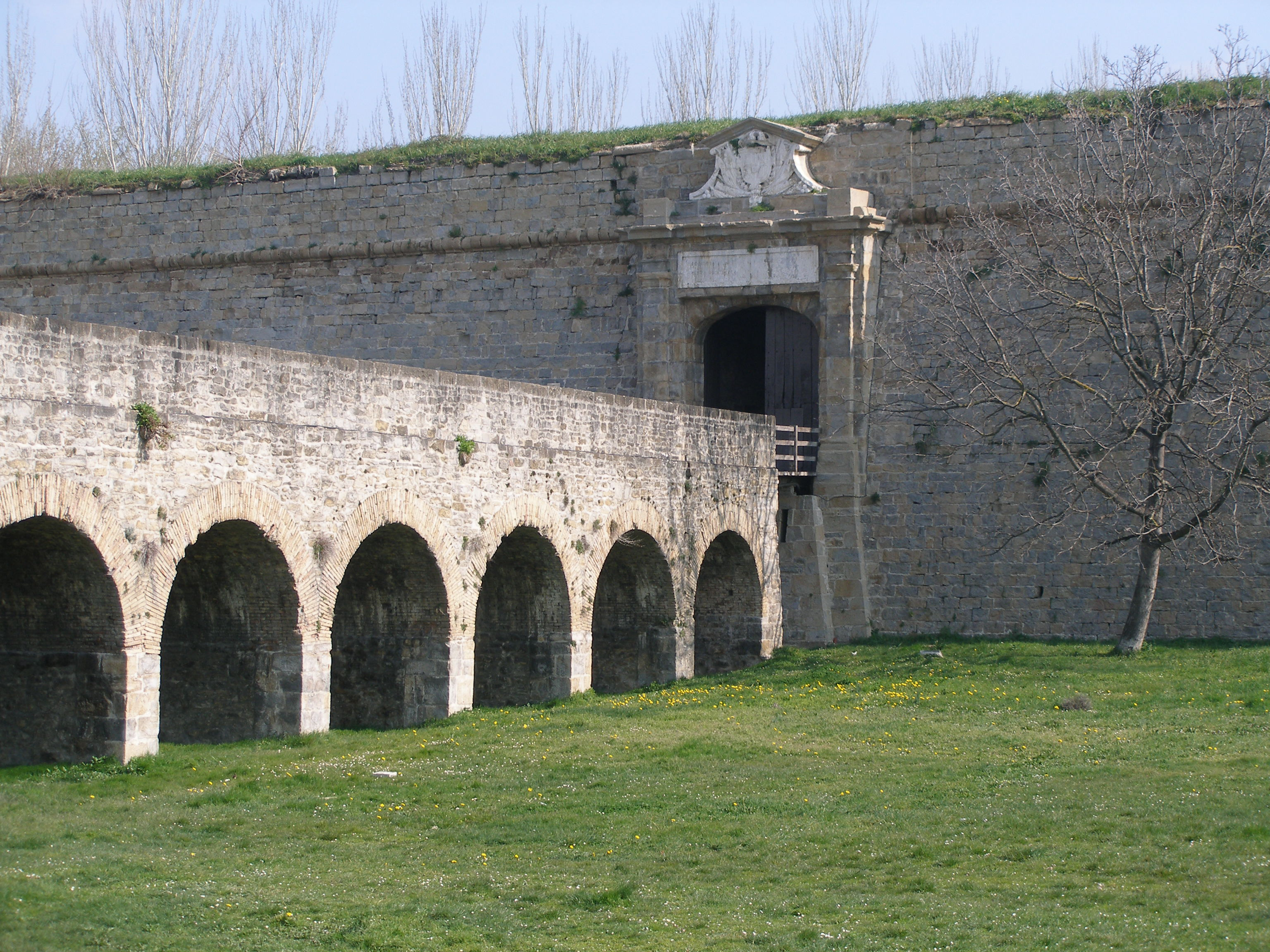
The Socorro Gate, where numerous executions took place during the repression in Navarre during the Spanish Civil War

== See also ==
- Timeline of the Peninsular War

== Bibliography ==
- Víctor Echarri Iribarren (2000). The walls and the Pamplona Citadel.. Publications Fund of the Government of Navarra. ISBN 84-235-1998-8.
- F. Idoate (1954). The fortifications of Pamplona from the conquest of Navarra. Reprinted from the "Prince of Viana Magazine", Provincial Council of Navarra.
- Sarasa Asiáin, Alfredo (2006). Architecture guide of Pamplona and its region. Pamplona: official Basque-Navarro architects' school. ISBN 84-611-3284-X
- Martinena Ruiz, Juan José (1987). The Citadel of Pamplona (Short collection of Pamplona themes, vol 11).. Pamplona: Pamplona: City Hall of Pamplona/Iruñeko Udala. ISBN 84-505-5498-5
