= Antonio Arce =

Spanish army officer (1743 – c. 1817)

- Born: 1743; Brozas, Cáceres
- Died: c. 1817
- Military career
- Allegiance: Spain
- Branch: Army
- Rank: Lieutenant-General
- Conflicts: Peninsular War

Antonio Vicente de Arce (1743 – c. 1817) was a Spanish army officer and diputado for Extremadura at the Cortes of Cádiz (1813–1814).

== Career ==
=== Peninsular War ===
Arce was appointed lieutenant general by the Junta of Extremadura in June 1808. Serving under José Galluzo, the Captain-General of Extremadura, Arce prolonged the siege of Elvas until almost a month after the Convention of Cintra had been signed (August 1808), and despite orders from the Junta of Seville to abandon the siege and march with his army to Madrid. The following October, as Governor of Vich, he led Spanish troops in an action at Badalona.

In April 1809, as Governor of Badajoz, he rejected General Latour-Maubourg's call to surrender the city.

In July 1809, together with Francisco Yañez de Leiva, regent of the Audiencia of Extremadura, Arce was sent to Asturias by the Supreme Central Junta to arrange for the suppressed junta general of the Principality to be reinstated. Arce was appointed captain-general of that province shortly afterwards.

On 1 January 1810, the captain-general, unable to offer much resistance (Note: Arce had been left with some 4,000 men to cover the whole of Asturias when the Duke del Parque had moved his forces south, taking with him Ballasteros's division, the core of the Army of Asturias. (Oman, 1908: p. 217.)) to General Bonet's 7,000 troops out of Santander, evacuated Oviedo. (Note: On 29 March 1810, Bonet took the capital of Asturias for the fourth time in three months, the Spanish troops having once again retired without offering serious opposition, and forced to retreat to Tineo in the mountains. Bonet's men were now immobilized for the rest of the year, having to garrison Oviedo, the ports of Gijon and Aviles, as well as all the central and eastern Asturias, and, moreover, to defend the communication with Santander from Juan Díaz Porlier's continued attacks. (Oman, 1908: p. 217.))

== Postwar ==
In 1817, Arce was appointed to the Supreme War Council (Consejo Supremo de la Guerra).
