= This is worse =

Etching by Francisco de Goya

- Esto es peor (Spanish)
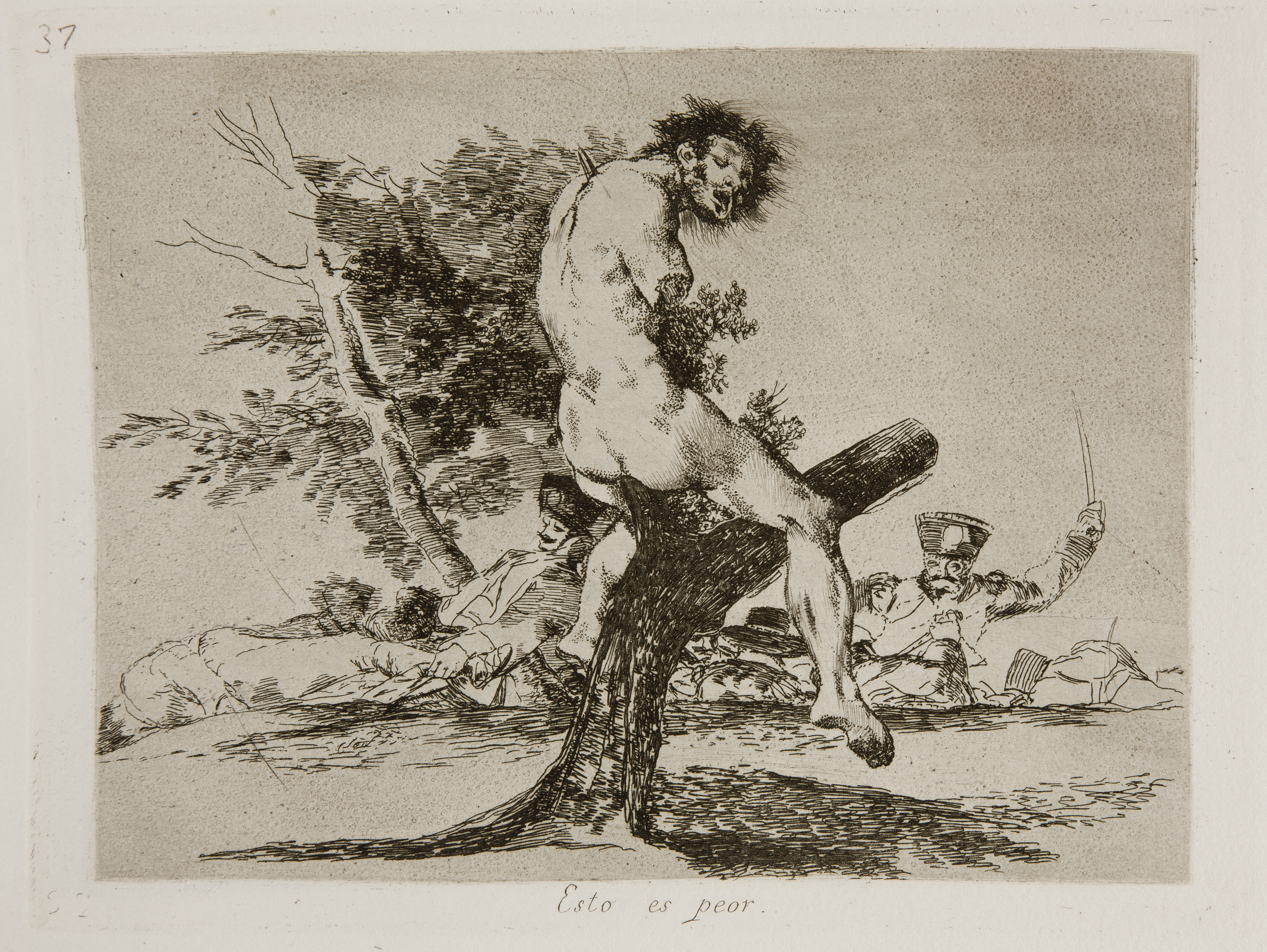
- Artist: Francisco Goya
- Year: c. 1812–1815
- Medium: Etching
- Dimensions: 15.5 cm × 20.8 cm (6.1 in × 8.2 in)
- Location: National Galleries of Scotland; Edinburgh

This is worse (Spanish: Esto es peor) is an etching and wash drawing by the Spanish artist Francisco Goya (1746–1828). Completed between 1812 and 1815, though not published until 1863, it forms part of his The Disasters of War series, which Goya created as a visual protest against the violence of the 1808 Dos de Mayo Uprising and subsequent Peninsular War of 1808–1814.

The image is based on a scene which occurred in Chinchón in December 1808, at a time when Goya's brother was living there as parish priest. When two French soldiers were killed by Spanish rebels, the French retaliated by massacring local men. Goya shows the mutilated body of a rebel impaled on the branches of a tree at two points – through his anus and shoulder blade. The victim's head is turned towards the picture's viewer, in a motif that echoes the title of another work in the Disasters series - One cannot look. His right arm has been chopped off above the elbow. In the background, French soldiers carry on with the massacre. The drawing contains sexual undertones in that the victim appears to have been raped.

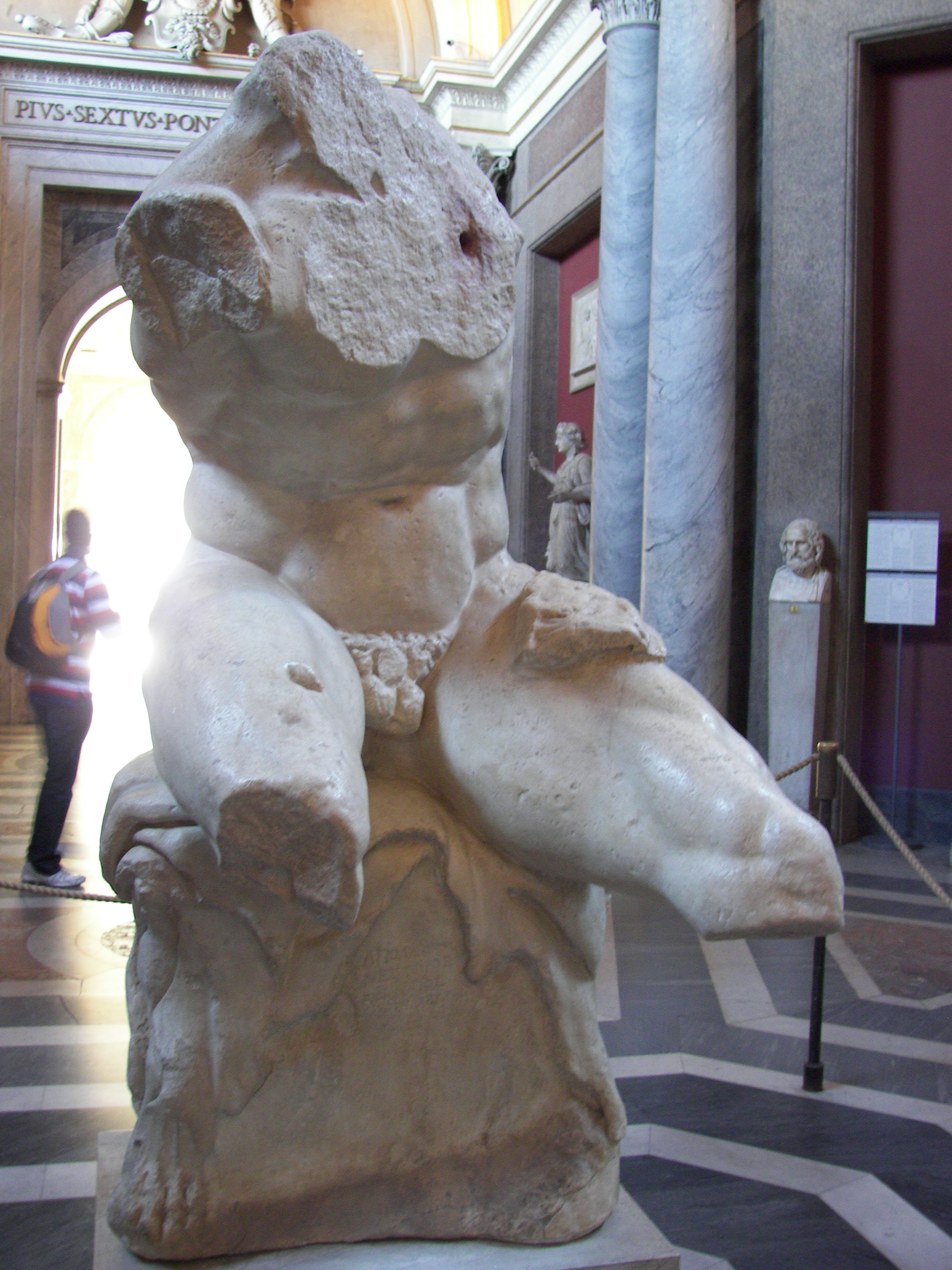
The Belvedere Torso influenced Goya's depiction of the mutilated corpse

The figuration of the dead man is based in part on the Hellenistic fragment of a male nude, the Belvedere Torso, by an Athenian sculptor. Goya had earlier made a black wash drawing study of the statue during a visit to Rome. However, he subverts the classical motifs used in war art by adding a degree of theatre – the branch through the anus, animated shoulders and close framing. The man is naked, itself a daring presentation for Spanish art in the 19th century.

An 1863 print of This is Worse was purchased by the National Galleries of Scotland in 1967.

== Bibliography ==
- Bareau, Juliet Wilson. Goya's Prints, The Tomás Harris Collection in the British Museum. London: British Museum Publications, 1981. ISBN 0-7141-0789-1
- Connell, Evan S. Francisco Goya: A Life. New York: Counterpoint, 2004. ISBN 1-58243-307-0
- Cottom, Daniel. "Unhuman culture". University of Pennsylvania, 2006. ISBN 0-8122-3956-3
- Hughes, Robert. Goya. New York: Alfred A. Knopf, 2004. ISBN 0-394-58028-1
- Stoichita, Victor & Coderch, Anna Maria. Goya: the Last Carnival. London: Reakton books, 1999. ISBN 1-86189-045-1
