= Felipe Carlos Osorio y Castellví =

Spanish nobleman and soldier

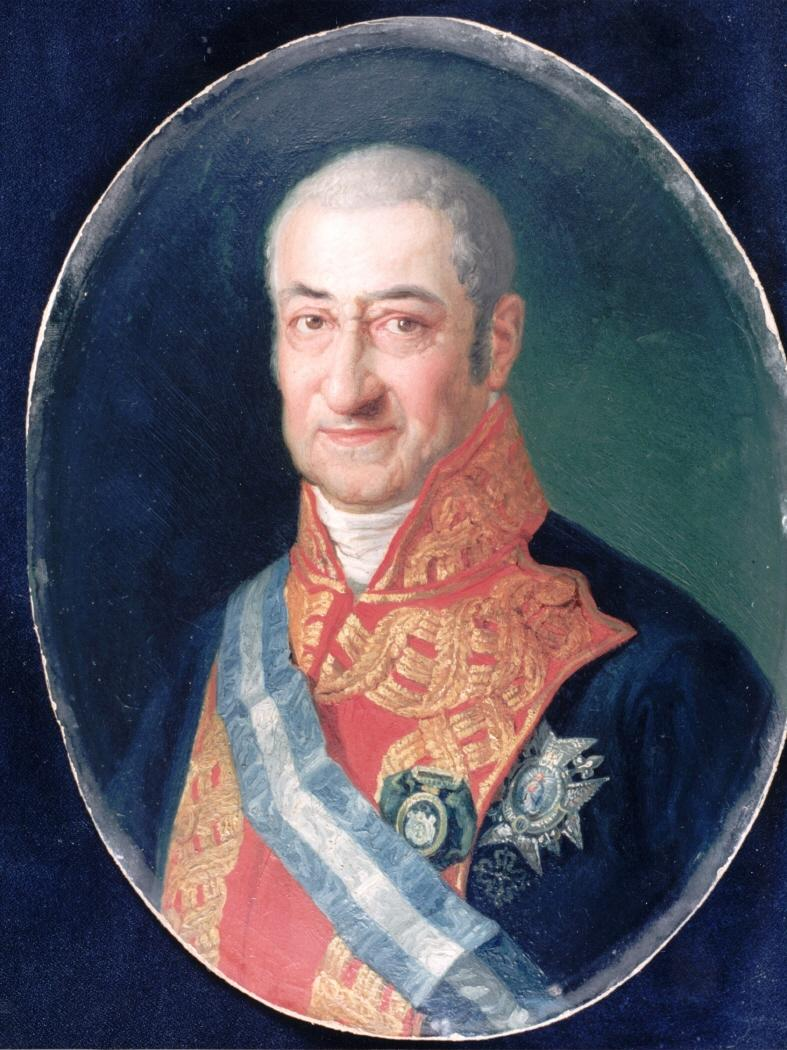
Felipe Carlos Osorio y Castelví, conde de Cervellón, by Vicente López Portaña (Museo Lázaro Galdiano)

Felipe Carlos Osorio y Castelví, 6th conde de Cervellón (1762–1815) was a Spanish noble and military commander.

== Early career ==
Promoted to lieutenant general in 1795, he was appointed interim captain-general of Valencia in December 1807.

== Peninsular War ==
At the start of the war, the Junta Provincial gave him the command of the Army of Valencia. However, his failure to detain Marshal Moncey's advance towards Valencia, led to that city being attacked in late June 1808. That, together with his inability to follow up on the Spanish victory by confronting the retreating French troops, which had suffered greatly during the battle, having lost at least 1,200 men, a sixth of Moncey's infantry, led to the Junta relieving him of his command, which was given to González Llamas.

Cervellón was without command for the rest of the war.

== Post-war career ==
After the war, Cervellón was appointed second-in-command of the Army of Valencia, later "acting very prudently" on being given false orders to arrest the captain-general of Valencia, Francisco Javier de Elío.
