= Dominique Honoré Antoine Vedel =

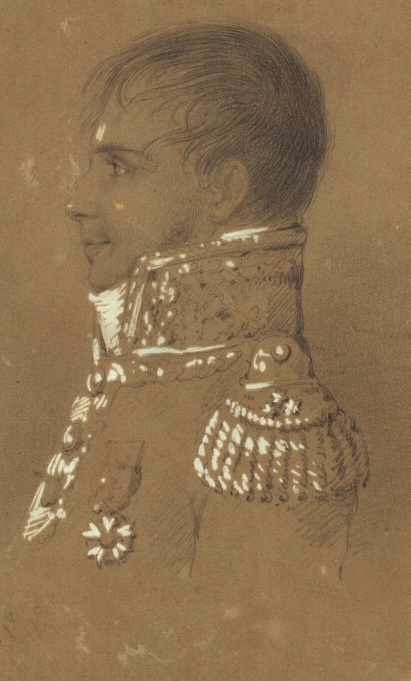
General of Division Dominique Honoré Antoine Vedel

Dominique Honoré Antoine Vedel (French pronunciation: [dɔminik ɔnɔʁe ɑ̃twan vədɛl]; 2 July 1771 – 30 March 1848) was a French general who participated in the French Revolution, the War of the Fourth Coalition and the Peninsular War.

Serving in both cases under Marshal Jean Lannes, Vedel fought at the Battle of Saalfeld (1806) and was wounded at the Battle of Pułtusk (1806) in Poland.

== Peninsular War ==
During the first few weeks of June 1808, Napoleon's troops had great difficulty in maintaining fluid communications between Madrid and Andalusia, mainly due to the activity of guerrilleros in the Sierra Morena. On 19 June, Vedel was ordered to head south from Toledo with a division of 6,000 men, 700 horse, and 12 guns to force a passage over the mountain range, hold the mountains from the guerrillas, and link up with General Dupont, pacifying Castile-La Mancha along the way. Vedel was joined during the march by small detachments under Generals Roize and Ligier-Belair. On 26 June 1808, Vedel's column defeated Valdecaños' detachment of Spanish regulars and guerrillas with six guns blocking the mountain pass of Puerta del Rey at Despeñaperros. Leaving a battalion at Puerta del Rey, Vedel met up with Dupont at La Carolina the following day, reestablishing military communications with Madrid after a month of disruption.

Around midday on 16 July, Vedel moved from Guarromán to Bailén bringing up Legrange's cuirassiers, Cassagne's legion, and Dufour's brigade for an attack on Reding's troops. On the Spanish side, Reding deployed Coupigny's division to meet the threat, with an Irish battalion and two guns on a knoll leading up to the mountains; a regiment of regular troops, the Órdenes militares, at the San Cristóbal monastery; militia in support; and the other battalions drawn up behind, in the centre. Two Spanish officers approached Vedel under a flag of truce, announcing that Dupont had been badly defeated and had proposed to suspend arms; the Frenchman replied, "Tell your General, that I care nothing about that, and that I am going to attack him."

Vedel directed Cassagne's legion, supported by Boussart's dragoons, against the Irish position on the knoll. While Cassagne grappled the Irish, Boussard raced around the enemy flank and rear, trampled part of Coussigny's militia regiment, and enveloped the knoll. Their guns lost, the Irish battalion surrendered, and Vedel's men took the knoll and 1,500 prisoners.

Dupont, having decided to call for a truce, negotiating terms with the Spanish officers over several days. After learning this, Vedel withdrew some distance along the highway, but Spanish commanders threatened to massacre Dupont's soldiers if Vedel did not also surrender.

Following the capitulation of the French troops at the Battle of Bailén, Vedel, like the other high-ranking officers who were fortunate enough be returned to France, was sent before a court-martial, deprived of his rank and title, and imprisoned.

In December, 1813, he was reinstated as general de division and given command of the 2nd division of the Army of Italy. In 1814, he was transferred to the Army of Lyon under Marshal Augereau. He served under the Bourbons 1814–15. He held command of the 14th military division (district) during the 100 Days and was retired by the reinstated Bourbons until 1818, when he was reinstated as "available" but never served again. Throughout his life, he had to defend his activities at Bailen and counter the claim that he was removed permanently from command.

He died in Paris in 1848, and is buried at the Père Lachaise Cemetery in Paris.
