= Jacques-Nicolas Gobert =

French general

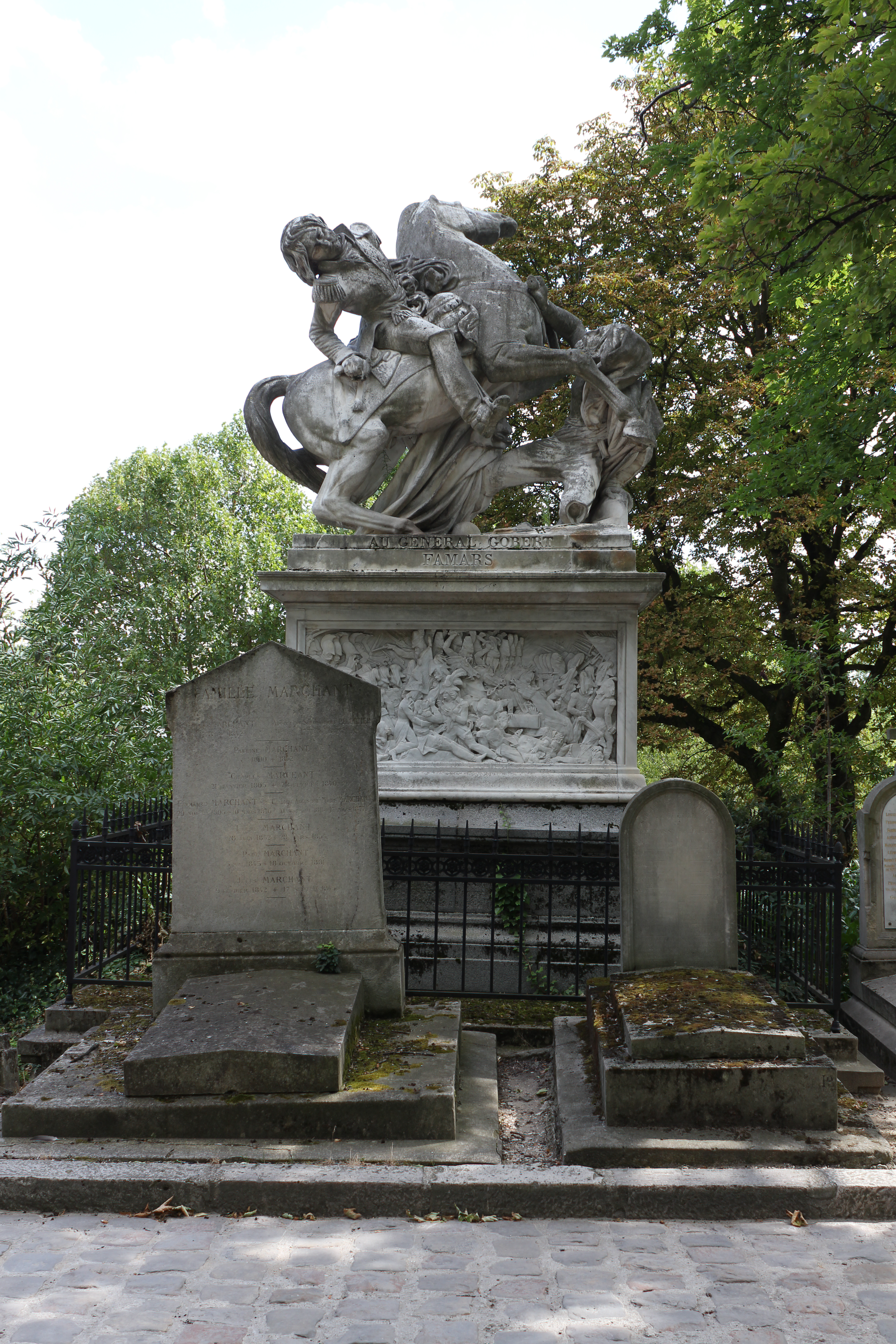
Monument to General Gobert in Père Lachaise Cemetery by David d'Angers.

Jacques-Nicolas Gobert (French pronunciation: [ʒak nikɔla ɡɔbɛʁ]; 1 June 1760 – 17 July 1808) was a French general who was killed in action in Spain during the Peninsular War.

He set out from Madrid with a division on 2 July 1808 to join General Dupont in Jaén. Defeating the insurgents who attacked his troops in the Sierra Morena, he and General Lefranc passed the Puerta del Rey, where he left a battalion, on 15 July 15, and reached Bailén with only one brigade, as the remainder of his troops was needed to hold the road north through the mountains against the guerrillas.

During the Battle of Bailén, after joining General Liger-Belair on the road between Bailén and Mengíbar, he was wounded by a ball to the head while rallying his troops. He died in Guarromán on the night of 16 to 17 July.

Gobert was a friend of Dupont's, having served on his staff in Tuscany, and had requested the transfer of his division from General Moncey's corps to that of Dupont.
