= Battle of Bailén =

1808 battle of the Peninsular War

- Part of the Peninsular War
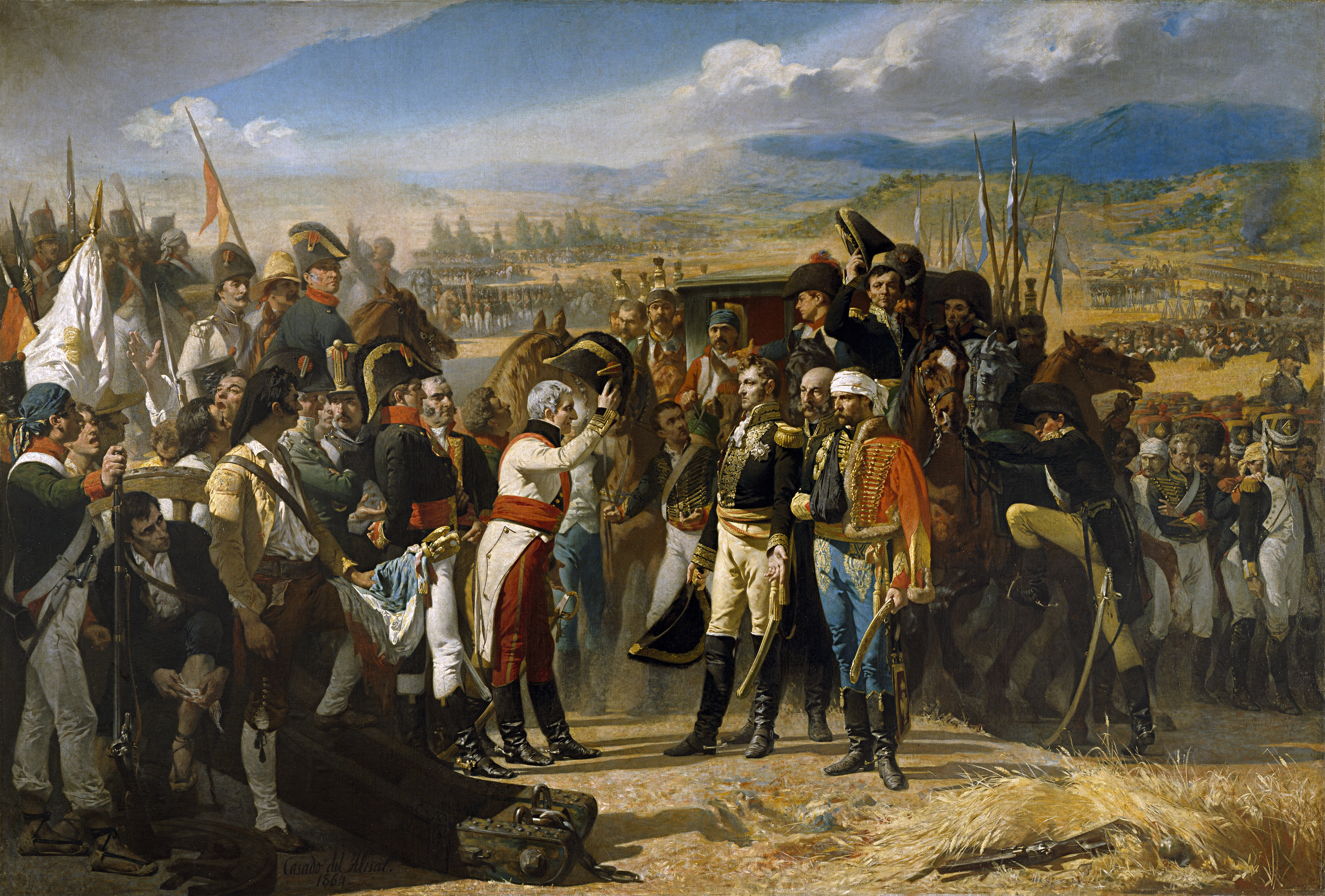
- The Surrender of Bailén; José Casado del Alisal, 1864 (Note: With this canvas painted in Paris, Casado del Alisal reached his own understanding of Velázquez, bringing a new realism to Spanish history painting. [...] Casado turns his eye to a much more recent case, evoking one of the crucial moments in the then still-fresh War of Independence (1808-1814), which was still an especially sensitive episode for the society of his time. Beginning with this work, that war began to play a leading role in monumental history paintings. (Díez, 2007).)
Date	16–19 July 1808
Location	Bailén, Spain 38°06′N 3°48′W
Result	Spanish victory

Belligerents
Spain	France

Commanders and leaders
Francisco Javier Castaños	Pierre Dupont (POW)

Strength
29,770–30,000	20,000–24,430

Casualties and losses
1,000 killed or wounded	3,000 killed or wounded 17,000 captured

Peninsular War: Spain
current battle
Wellington in command
Wellington not in command

The Battle of Bailén was fought in 1808 between the Spanish Army's Army of Andalusia, under General Francisco Javier Castaños and the French Imperial Army's 2nd Gironde Observational Corps under Divisional-General Pierre Dupont de l'Étang. The first open-field defeat of a Napoleonic army, the battle's heaviest fighting took place near Bailén (sometimes anglicized as Baylen), a village by the Guadalquivir river in the Jaén province of southern Spain.

In June 1808, following the widespread uprisings against the French occupation of Spain, Napoleon organized French units into flying columns to pacify Spain's major centres of resistance. One column under Dupont was dispatched across the Sierra Morena and south through Andalusia towards the port of Cádiz where a French naval squadron lay at the mercy of the Spanish. The Emperor was confident that with 20,000 men, Dupont would crush any opposition encountered on the way, despite most of them being inexperienced new recruits. Events proved otherwise when Dupont and his men stormed and plundered Córdoba in July. General Castaños, commanding the Spanish field army at San Roque, and General Theodor von Reding, Governor of Málaga, travelled to Seville to negotiate with the Seville Junta—a patriotic assembly committed to resisting the French incursions—and to turn the province's combined forces against the French. Upon learning of the approach of a larger Spanish force, Dupont fell back to the north of the province. Sick and burdened with wagons of loot, he unwisely decided to await reinforcements from Madrid. However, his messengers were all intercepted and killed and a French division under General Dominique Vedel, dispatched by Dupont to clear the road to Madrid, became separated from the main body.

Between 16 and 19 July, Spanish forces converged on the French positions stretched out along villages on the Guadalquivir and attacked at several points, forcing the confused French defenders to permanently reposition and re-organize their troops. With Castaños pinning Dupont downstream at Andújar, Reding's troops successfully crossed the river at Mengibar and seized Bailén, interposing himself between the two wings of the French army. Caught between the troops of Castaños and Reding, Dupont attempted in vain to order his troops to break through the Spanish line at Bailén in three bloody and desperate charges, suffering 2,000 casualties, including himself wounded. With his men short of supplies and without water in the sweltering heat, Dupont entered into talks with the Spanish.

Vedel's army finally arrived, but it was already too late. In the talks, Dupont had agreed to surrender not only his own but Vedel's force as well even though the latter's troops were outside the Spanish encirclement with a good chance of escape; a total of 17,000 men were captured, making Bailén the worst defeat suffered by the French in the entire Peninsular War. Under the surrender terms, the men were to be repatriated to France, but the Spanish did not honor the terms and transferred them to the island of Cabrera, where most died of starvation.

When news of the catastrophe reached Joseph Bonaparte's court in Madrid, the result was a general retreat to the Ebro, abandoning much of Spain to the insurgents. France's enemies throughout Europe celebrated this first major defeat inflicted on the hitherto unbeaten French Imperial Army. "Spain was overjoyed, Britain exultant, France dismayed, and Napoleon outraged. It was the greatest defeat the Napoleonic empire had ever suffered, and, what is more, one inflicted by an opponent for whom the emperor had affected nothing but scorn."—tales of Spanish heroism inspired Austria and showed the force of nationwide resistance to Napoleon, setting in motion the rise of the Fifth Coalition against France.

Alarmed by these developments, Napoleon decided to personally take command of the Spanish theatre and invaded Spain with the Grande Armée. They dealt devastating blows to the Spanish army, recapturing lost territories and occupying Madrid by November 1808, before turning their attention to Austria. The struggle in Spain continued for many more years. Enormous resources were committed by the French to a long war of attrition waged against determined Spanish guerrillas, ultimately leading to the expulsion of L'Armée d'Espagne (The Army of Spain) from the Iberian Peninsula and the exposure of southern France to invasion in 1814 by British, Portuguese and Spanish forces.

== Background ==
The Spanish conventional warfare had started with the Battles of El Bruch.

Months before, thousands of French troops had marched into Spain to support a Spanish invasion of Portugal orchestrated by Napoleon, who used the opportunity to initiate intrigues against the Spanish royal family. A coup d'état, instigated by Spanish aristocrats with French support, forced Charles IV from his throne in favour of his son Ferdinand VII, and in April, Napoleon removed both royals to Bayonne to secure their abdication and replace the Spanish Bourbon line with a Bonapartist dynasty headed by his brother Joseph Bonaparte.

However, none of these policies sat well with the Spanish masses, who declared their loyalty to the deposed Ferdinand and revolted at the prospect of a foreign ruler. The uprising by the citizens of Madrid broke out on 2 May, slew 150 French soldiers, and was violently stamped out by Marshal Joachim Murat's elite Imperial Guards and Mamluk cavalry. Joseph's entry into his prospective kingdom was delayed as guerrillas poured down from the mountains and seized or threatened the main roads.

"You are making a mistake, Sire. Your glory will not be enough to subjugate Spain. I shall fail and the limits of your power will be exposed."

— Joseph Bonaparte to Napoleon

On 26 May, Joseph Bonaparte, in absentia, was proclaimed King of Spain and the Indies in Madrid, his envoys receiving the acclamations of the Spanish notables. The madrileños, however, were indignant; Spanish soldiers quietly withdrew to insurgent-held villages and outposts outside the city, and only Murat's 20,000 bayonets kept the city in order.

Outside the capital, the French strategic situation deteriorated rapidly. The bulk of the French army, 80,000 strong, could hold only a narrow strip of central Spain stretching from Pamplona and San Sebastián in the north through to Madrid and Toledo to the south. Murat, stricken in an outbreak of rheumatic colic which swept the French camp, quit his command and returned to France for treatment: "the Spanish priests would have rejoiced if the hand of God had been laid on him whom they called the butcher of the 2nd of May." General Anne Jean Marie René Savary, a man "more distinguished as Minister of Police than as any field commander", arrived to take command of the shaky French garrison at a critical hour.

With much of Spain in open revolt, Napoleon established a headquarters at Bayonne on the Spanish frontier to reorganize his beleaguered forces and redress the situation. Having little respect for his Spanish opponents, the Emperor decided that a swift display of force would cow the insurgents and quickly consolidate his control of Spain. To this end, Napoleon dispatched a number of flying columns to throttle the rebellion by seizing and pacifying Spain's major cities: from Madrid, Marshal Jean-Baptiste Bessières pushed northwest into Old Castile with 25,000 men and sent a detachment east into Aragón, aiming to capture Santander with one hand and Zaragoza with the other; Marshal Bon Adrien Jeannot de Moncey marched toward Valencia with 29,350 men; and General Guillaume Philibert Duhesme marshalled 12,710 troops in Catalonia and put Gerona under siege. Finally, Divisional-General Pierre Dupont de l'Étang, a distinguished division commander, was to lead 13,000 men south toward Seville and ultimately the port of Cádiz, which sheltered Admiral François Rosilly's fleet from the Royal Navy.

== War reaches Andalusia ==
Dupont's corps primarily fielded of second-line forces of a distinctly unimpressive character. These second-line troops, originally raised as provisional or reserve formations, had been intended either for internal police services or garrison duty in Prussia—evidence that Napoleon intended the Spanish campaign to be "a mere promenade." This force approached Córdoba in early June and in their first formal battle on Andalusian soil, captured the bridge at Alcolea, sweeping past the Spanish troops under Colonel Pedro de Echávarri that attempted to block their progress. The French entered Córdoba that same afternoon and ransacked the town for four days. However, in the face of increasingly menacing mass uprisings across Andalusia, Dupont decided to withdraw to the Sierra Morena, counting on help from Madrid.

The French retreated in the sweltering heat, burdened with some 500 wagons of loot and 1,200 ill. A French surgeon remarked: "Our little army carried enough baggage for 150,000 men. Mere captains required wagons drawn by four mules. We counted more than 50 wagons per battalion, the result of the plunder of Córdoba. All our movements were impeded. We owed our defeat to the greed of our generals." "Récit du Docteur Treille" in Larchey, p. 1: "Notre petite armée avait plus de bagages qu'une armée de 150,000 hommes. De simples capitaines et des civils assimilés à ce grade avaient des carrosses à quatre mules. On comptait au moins cinquante chariots par bataillon; c'étaient les dépouilles de la ville de Cordova. Nos mouvements en étaient gênés. Nous dûmes notre perte à la cupidité des chefs." General Jacques-Nicolas Gobert's division set out from Madrid on 2 July to add weight to Dupont's expedition. However, only one brigade of his division ultimately reached Dupont, the rest being needed to hold the road north against the guerrillas.

=== Reinforcements across the Sierra ===
Napoleon and the French strategists, anxious about their communications with Bayonne and wary of a British descent upon a Biscayan coast already in open revolt, initially prioritized operations in the north of Spain. In mid-June General Antoine Charles Louis Lasalle's victory at Cabezón simplified matters tremendously; with the Spanish militias around Valladolid destroyed and much of Old Castile overrun, Savary shifted his gaze south and resolved to reopen communications with Dupont in Andalusia. Apart from the menace in the north, Napoleon was most anxious to secure the Andalusian provinces, where the traditional, rural peasantry was expected to resist Joseph's rule. On 19 June Vedel, with Dupont's 2nd Infantry Division, was dispatched south from Toledo to force a passage over the Sierra Morena, hold the mountains from the guerrillas, and link up with Dupont, pacifying Castile-La Mancha along the way.

Vedel set out with 6,000 men, 700 horse, and 12 guns, joined during the march by small detachments under Generals Claude Roize and Louis Liger-Belair. The column raced across the plains, encountering no resistance, although stragglers were seized and cut down by the locals. Reaching the sierra on 26 June, the column found a detachment of Spanish regulars, smugglers, and guerrillas with six guns under Lieutenant-colonel Valdecaños blocking the Puerta del Rey. Napier assigns a strength of 3,000 men to the Spaniards, but claims their colonel defected to Vedel. Vedel's troops stormed the ridge and overran the enemy cannon, losing 17 dead or wounded. They then pushed south over the mountains toward La Carolina. The next day they encountered a detachment of Dupont's troops preparing to attack these same passes from the south side. With this junction, communications between Dupont and Madrid were reestablished after a month of silence.

=== Confused orders ===
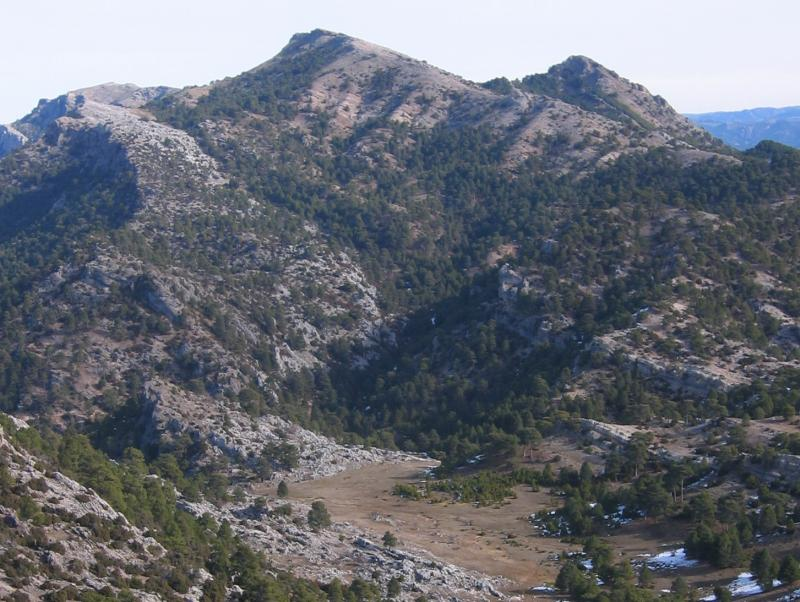
Sierra Morena

Vedel carried new orders from Madrid and Bayonne: Dupont was instructed to stop his march on Cádiz and fall back north-eastwards on the mountains (a fait accompli), watching the Spanish movements in Andalusia while awaiting the reinforcements to be released upon the capitulation of Zaragoza and Valencia. These capitulations never came. For a time Marshal Moncey was simply nowhere to be found; at length his defeat at the gates of Valencia surfaced; some 17,000 Spaniards under the Conde de Cervellón massed victoriously around that city as Moncey gave up in disgust, having lost 1,000 men in a vain attempt to storm the walls. Suddenly, all prospects evaporated of Moncey's corps pivoting west from Valencia toward Granada and coupling with Dupont in a two-pronged invasion of Andalusia. Nor were troops forthcoming from Aragon, as Zaragoza shook off repeated French assaults and vowed to fight to the death. Meanwhile, Savary set to work preparing for the arrival of Joseph in his new capital. Many of the scattered French formations were drawn back around Madrid for security; Dupont would remain close at hand to succour the capital if Bessières' campaign in the north took a turn for the worse and Spanish armies appeared on the horizon.

Yet at no time was Dupont's Andalusian expedition altogether scrapped. Savary continued to issue vague orders promising reinforcements at an undisclosed date while Napoleon fumed at the prospect of abandoning even Andújar to the Spaniards. With events hanging in the air, Dupont chose to hold his ground along the Guadalquivir, sacking and occupying the town of Bailén and the provincial capital of Jaén, instead of completing his retrograde movement to the strong positions atop the sierra's defiles. Napoleon wrote lightly, "even if he suffers a setback, ... he will just have to come back over the Sierra."

=== Spain prepares ===
On learning of the French incursion into the southern provinces, General Francisco Javier Castaños, guessing Dupont's intentions, prepared to entrench his army in a fortified camp across from the strongpoint of Cádiz, but Dupont's retrograde movement rendered these precautions unnecessary. Setting up a general headquarters in Utrera, Castaños organized the Army of Andalusia into four divisions under Generals Theodor von Reding, Antonio Malet, Marquis of Coupigny (whose staff included a young San Martín, then a captain in the Spanish Army), Félix Jones, and a fourth (Reserve) under Manuel Lapeña, whose division included Colonel Juan de la Cruz Mourgeón's column of some 1,000 skirmishers, armed peasants, and other light infantry.

=== Stalled on the Guadalquivir ===
While Dupont lingered at Andújar with two divisions (Generals Gabriel Barbou des Courières and Maurice Ignace Fresia), attempting to master the strategic Madrid—Seville highway and the wide plains which it crossed, Castaños' four divisions advanced steadily from the south and guerrillas from Granada marched to bar the road to the sierra and La Mancha beyond. Vedel's division was posted east to Bailén with a view to guarding these nearby mountain passes and on 1 July Vedel was forced to dispatch a brigade under General Louis Victorin Cassagne to curb the advance of the guerrillas on Jaén and La Carolina, stretching the French line still further east. Meanwhile, General Liger-Bélair, with 1,500 men, moved into a forward post at Mengíbar, a village on the south bank of the Guadalquivir. At Andújar a tower by the river was fortified and small field works constructed on the south bank to forestall an enemy crossing, but, the Guadalquivir being fordable at so many points, and open to fire from the surrounding hills, Dupont's defences did not inspire much confidence. Cassagne, after driving the guerrillas off in rout, returned to Bailén on 5 July with 200 dead or wounded and nothing to show for his exertion—the Spaniards having plundered the towns of all provisions.

Glimmers of the long-promised reinforcements appeared at last: Generals Gobert and Jacques Lefranc passed the Puerta del Rey on 15 July, leaving behind a strong garrison in the Morena, and descended into Andalusia with their remaining infantry and cuirassiers. Dupont now had over 20,000 men idling along the Guadalquivir while the Spaniards massed and approached. But supplies were scarce and the Spanish peasants had deserted their fields, obliging Dupont's wearied men to bring in the harvest, grind the grain, and bake their own rations; 600 men fell ill during their fortnight's stay by drinking the putrid waters of the Guadalquivir. According to French testimony, "The situation was terrible. Every night, we heard armed peasants roaming around us, drawn to our goods, and every night, we expected to be assassinated." Larchey, p. 4: La situation était terrible. Chaque nuit, nous entendions les paysans armés rôder autour de nous, alléchés qu'ils étaient par l'espoir du butin, et chaque nuit, nous nous attendions à être assassinés.

=== Early fighting ===
On 9 July, Napier gives the date as 1 July General Lapeña's division took up a position extending from El Carpio to Porcuna and the Army of Andalusia began a number of demonstrations against the French. From west to east along the Guadalquivir, Castaños with 14,000 men in two divisions (Lapeña and Jones) approached Dupont at Andújar, Coupigny advanced his division to Villa Nueva, and Reding prepared to force a passage at Mengíbar and swing north to Bailén, outflanking the French and cutting Dupont's line of retreat to the mountains. Marching east to Jaén, Reding delivered a strong attack against the French right wing between 2 and 3 July, sending the 3rd Swiss regiment into the teeth of Cassagne's brigade. The Spaniards were forced back (losing 1,500 casualties according to Maximilien Sebastien Foy), but the isolated French brigade felt its danger and, on the 4th, Cassagne fell back over the Guadalquivir to Bailén, leaving only a few companies to guard the ferry at Mengíbar.

Reding assaulted Mengíbar anew on 13 July and drove Ligier-Belair from the village after a hard fight; at the appearance of Vedel's division, however, the Spanish column quietly drew back and French infantry reclaimed the town. The next day Coupigny tested the grounds at Villa Nueva and engaged the French piquets opposite him in a sharp skirmish. Castaños reached the heights at Arjonilla on 15 July and, setting up a battery on a ridge overlooking Andújar, opened fire on Dupont. At the same time, 1,600 4,000 skirmishers and irregulars under Colonel Cruz-Mourgeón forded the river near Marmolejo and attacked towards Dupont's rear, but were handily repulsed by a French battalion and dispersed into the hills. Alarmed by this show of force, Dupont called on Vedel to release a battalion or even a brigade to his assistance, and Vedel, judging that Mengíbar was not seriously threatened, set out in the night with his entire division. The arrival of Vedel with this sizeable force put an end to the threat at Andújar but gravely imperilled the French left wing (Mengíbar—Bailén—La Carolina), leaving Ligier-Belair seriously denuded of troops in his fight against Reding.

== Battle ==
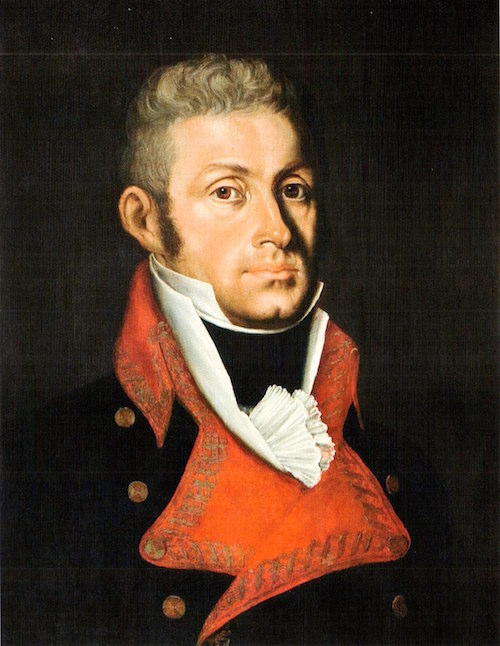
Theodor von Reding

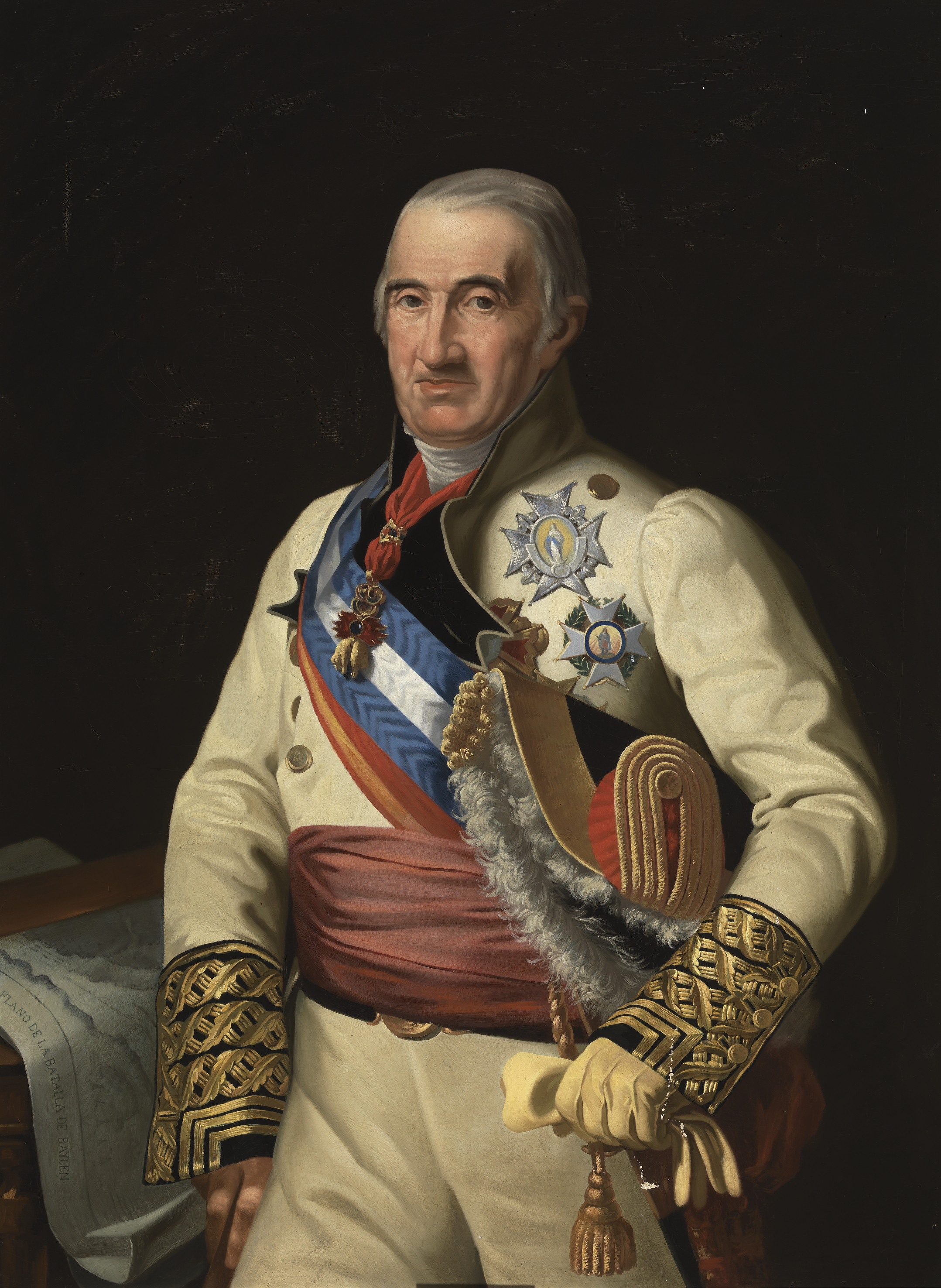
Francisco Javier Castaños

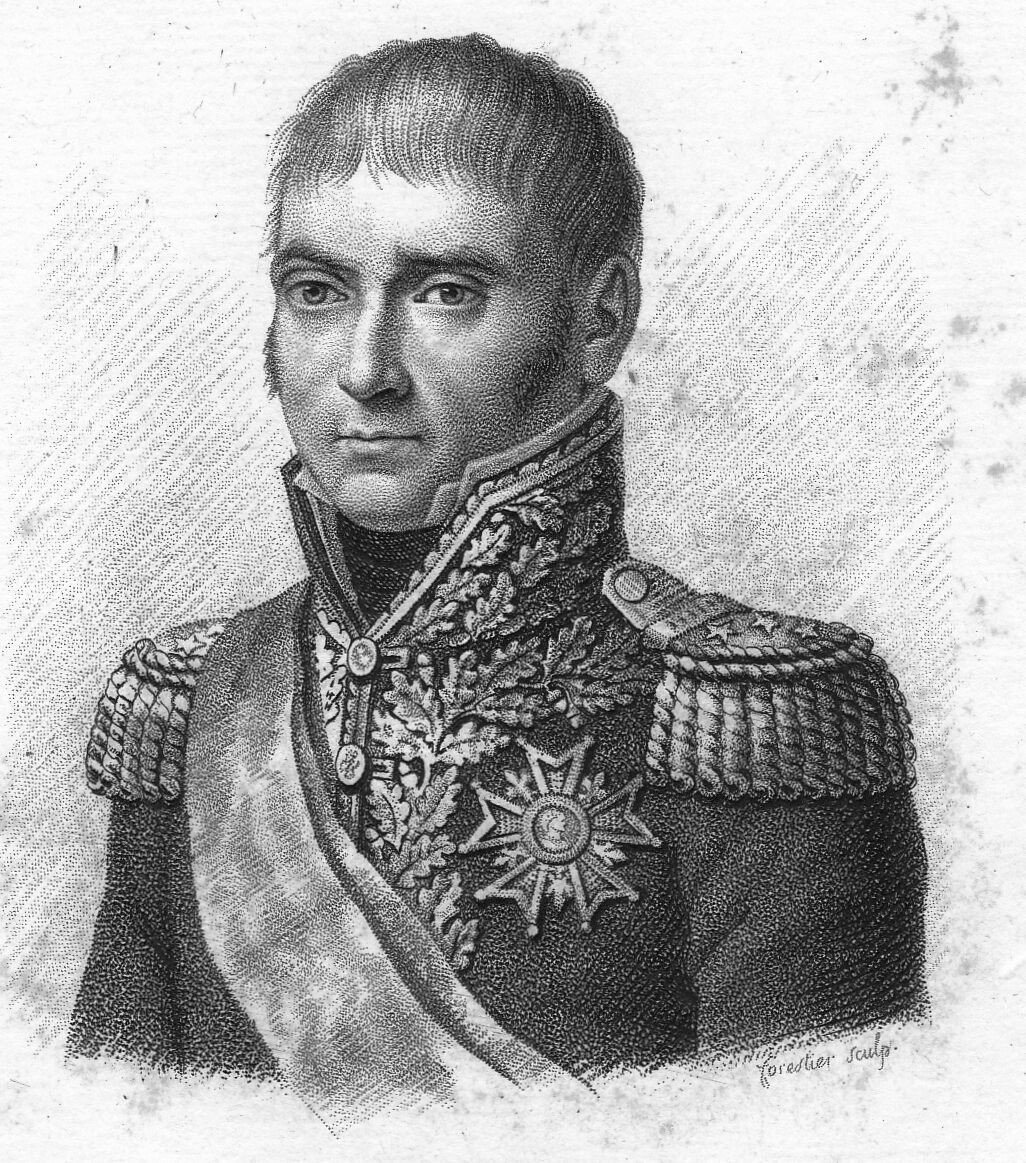
Pierre Dupont de l'Étang

On 16 July Dupont and Vedel, expecting a desperate struggle for Andújar, found Castaños and Coupigny merely repeating the previous day's noisy demonstrations without seriously attempting a passage. Reding, however, was on the move: making a feint toward the Mengibar ferry with his sharpshooters, the Swiss forded the river upstream at Rincon and, encircling Mengibar, crushed the French battalions under Ligier-Belair. General Gobert, rushing forth from Bailén to plug the gap, was shot in the head and later died of the wound, and his counterattack, carried on by General of Brigade François Bertrand Dufour, collapsed under the weight of the Spaniards. Distracting Reding with repeated charges from his cuirassiers, Dufour disengaged his men and fell back onto Bailén.

Alerted to the loss of Mengibar, Dupont hesitated once again. Unwilling to take advantage of Vedel's presence to engage in a trial of strength with Castaños—a successful attack on the Arjonilla might have turned the Spanish line in return and allowed Dupont to swing across the rear of Coupigny and Reding—Dupont hunkered down at Andújar and ordered Vedel's weary division back to Bailén to prevent the collapse of the right wing.

=== The right wings disengage ===
The fighting around Mengibar then took a curious turn: Reding, having finally gained the north bank and turned the French flank, suddenly retreated to the other side of the river, perhaps feeling isolated with his lone division. At the same time, guerrillas under Colonel Valdecanos made an unwelcome appearance on Dufour's flank, scattering his outposts and menacing the road to the Puerta del Rey. Dufour, conscious of the danger to the mountain passes, set off to confront the Spanish flankers at Guarromán and La Carolina. Consequently, when Vedel, by another tiring night march, retraced his steps to Bailén, he found the position oddly deserted of both friend and foe.

When his reconnaissance parties made no contact with the enemy at the Guadalquivir, Vedel concluded that Reding had shifted his division to another point along the line. Dufour sent back alarming reports from Guarromán, convincing Vedel that 10,000 Spaniards—perhaps Reding's division, he warned—were marching on the mountains to their rear. This was too much. Gathering his exhausted division, Vedel hurried to Dufour's aid on 17 July, arriving at Santa Carolina the next day. Dufour's fatal blunder was soon revealed. Vedel discovered that the small band of irregulars roaming about were not at all the threat Dufour had described; for the third time the Spaniards had stolen a march from him, and Reding still hovered somewhere around Mengibar, out of sight. Worse yet, an enormous gap now existed between Dupont and Vedel.

=== Trapped ===
News of Vedel's ill-advised movements reached Dupont at noon on 18 July and convinced him to fall back on Bailén and to recall Vedel there as well, re-concentrating his now dangerously scattered army: "I do not care to occupy Andujar. That post is of no consequence." With a wary eye on Castaños' columns across the river, and needing time to prepare his wagons and carriages (encumbered by plunder from the sack of Cordoba), Dupont postponed the retreat till nightfall, hoping to conceal his departure from the Spaniards. Meanwhile, Reding, calling up Coupigny's division from Villa Nueva, had crossed at Mengibar on 17 July and seized the deserted Bailén, bivouacing there the night and preparing to swing west towards Dupont's—and what he assumed to be Vedel's (oblivious as he was to the latter's recent movement east)—position in the morning.

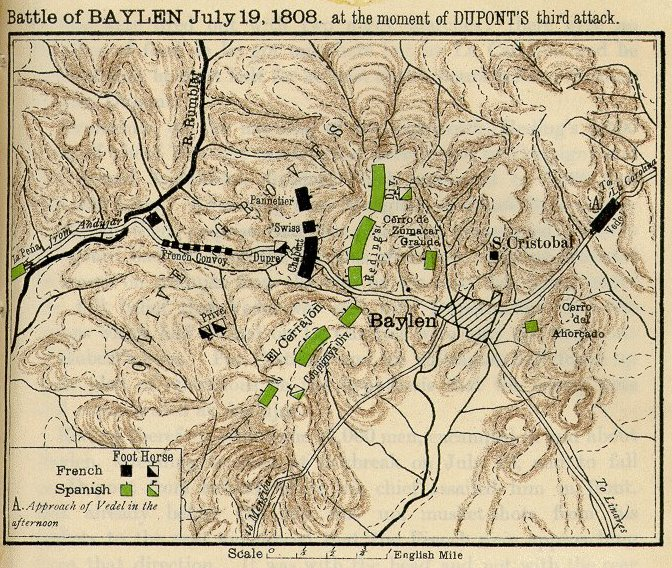
Reding (green) blocks Dupont's (black) retreat

Vedel quit La Carolina at 5:00 a.m. on 18 July and rushed the bone-weary French right wing south-west toward Bailén, unwittingly bearing down on Reding's rear. Both armies were now north of the Guadalquivir and staggered in a curious position: Dupont between Castaños and Reding; Reding between Dupont and Vedel. At Guarromán, scarcely two leagues from Bailén, Vedel rested his footsore troops for a few hours—"he could not refuse this", says General Foy, "after three days and three nights of incessant marching"—while patrols raced west to Linares to secure his rear. Aware neither that Dupont was preparing to move in his direction, nor that Vedel was now in fact drawing in behind him, Reding, posting a few battalions to hold Bailén from whatever French formations might remain in the east, set off with his two divisions westwards on 18 July, intending to surround Andújar from the rear and smash Dupont against Castaños.

Dupont slipped away from Andújar unobserved and at dawn on 19 July, his vanguard under Brigadier Théodore Chabert made contact with Reding's leading elements (veterans of the Walloon Guard) just shy of Bailén. Though caught off guard, Reding reacted "with promptitude and skill," dissolving his columns and drawing up a defensive line with 20 guns in an olive grove intersected with deep ravines, about two miles from Dupont's main body. Badly underestimating the force before him, Chabert charged his 3,000 men into Reding's two divisions and was repulsed with heavy losses. Dupont, following with the main body of the convoy at two leagues' distance, halted the bloodied vanguard, posted General Barbou to defend the rear against any pursuit by Castaños, and ordered all other formations to the fore in an attempt to crack Reding's line.

Expecting to be overtaken and crushed by Castaños' columns at any moment—one division under Lapeña had already crossed to Andújar in pursuit and approached steadily—Dupont committed his troops piecemeal, without massing a reserve. As one historian observes, his troops were "both exhausted and strung out, and to commit them to battle in dribs and drabs was foolhardy in the extreme." Brigadiers Chabert and Claude Francois Duprès led an infantry brigade and the horse chasseurs against the left wing, held by the Walloon Guards, but no ground was gained and Duprès fell mortally wounded at the head of his troops. Dupont's scattered guns were laboriously formed into batteries to support the attack only to be knocked out by the heavier Spanish artillery once the firing began. On the right, opposite Reding's militias and Swiss regulars, a fierce and desperate attack bent back the Spanish line. The cuirassiers trampled a Spanish infantry regiment, reached the artillery and sabred the gunners, but the defenders, extending their line and maintaining a constant fire, compelled the French to abandon the captured guns and fall back.

Fresh troops came up at 10:00 a.m. and Dupont immediately launched a third attack, with General Claude Marie Joseph Pannetier's brigade leading the charge. One last formation joined them; Capitaine de Vaisseau Daugier's Sailors of the Imperial Guard, the most veteran troops present, and the only Old Guard troops under Dupont: "They were only three hundred men", Foy remarks, "but they were three hundred whom no fears could ever make falter." Dupont, himself wounded in the hip, grouped his exhausted and worn-out regiments around the Guard battalion in a last effort to break through to Bailén. The assault pierced the first Spanish lines. At this point reserves may have reinforced the French within the badly shaken Spanish lines: Dupont had none; and the French columns, mercilessly raked by the Spanish artillery, were forced back down the slope for the third time.

The Battalion of Sailors conducted itself heroically... its beautiful attitude won the admiration of the Spaniards.

— Colonel Titeux

Dupont's Swiss regiments, originally in Spanish service, defected, arms and baggage, to their former masters; and lastly, Castaños' force finally arrived, overtaking Barbou along the Rumblar (a small tributary flowing from the Morena into the Guadalquivir), with Lapeña's division sounding its guns and preparing to storm the French rearguard. The day was lost.

=== Closing moves ===
An unexpected Spanish reinforcement appeared suddenly in the last minutes of the battle, slipping south out of the foothills along the Rumblar and taking up positions among the rocks on the French left flank: Colonel de la Cruz. Driven off into the mountains in the attack of 16 July, de la Cruz had regrouped 2,000 sharpshooters at Peñas del Moral and climbed back down towards the battle, directed by the sound of firing. Dupont was now hopelessly surrounded on three sides.

Towards noon, as Dupont's guns went quiet, Vedel continued from Guarromán onto Bailén and observed napping troops which he assumed to be Dupont's vanguard returning from Andújar—in fact they were Reding's Spaniards. Vedel and Reding prepared for battle, the former pulling up Legrange's cuirassiers, Cassagne's legion, and Dufour's brigade for the attack. On the Spanish side, Reding deployed Coupigny's division to meet the threat, with an Irish battalion and two guns on a knoll leading up to the mountains; a regiment of regular troops, the Órdenes militares, at the San Cristóbal monastery; militia in support; and the other battalions drawn up behind, in the centre. Two Spanish officers approached Vedel under a flag of truce, announcing that Dupont had been badly defeated and had proposed to suspend arms; the Frenchman replied, "Tell your General, that I care nothing about that, and that I am going to attack him."

Vedel directed Cassagne's legion, supported by André Joseph Boussart's dragoons, against the Irish position on the knoll. While Cassagne grappled the Irish, Boussard raced around the enemy flank and rear, trampled part of Coussigny's militia regiment, and enveloped the knoll. Their guns lost, the Irish battalion surrendered, and Vedel's men took the knoll and 1,500 prisoners. Meanwhile, Colonel Roche's column struck the Spanish strongpoint at San Cristóbal, possession of which was necessary if Vedel hoped to turn Coupigny and force open a path to Dupont. But here the Spanish regulars under Colonel Francisco Soler held their line obstinately and all attacks failed.

=== Capitulation ===
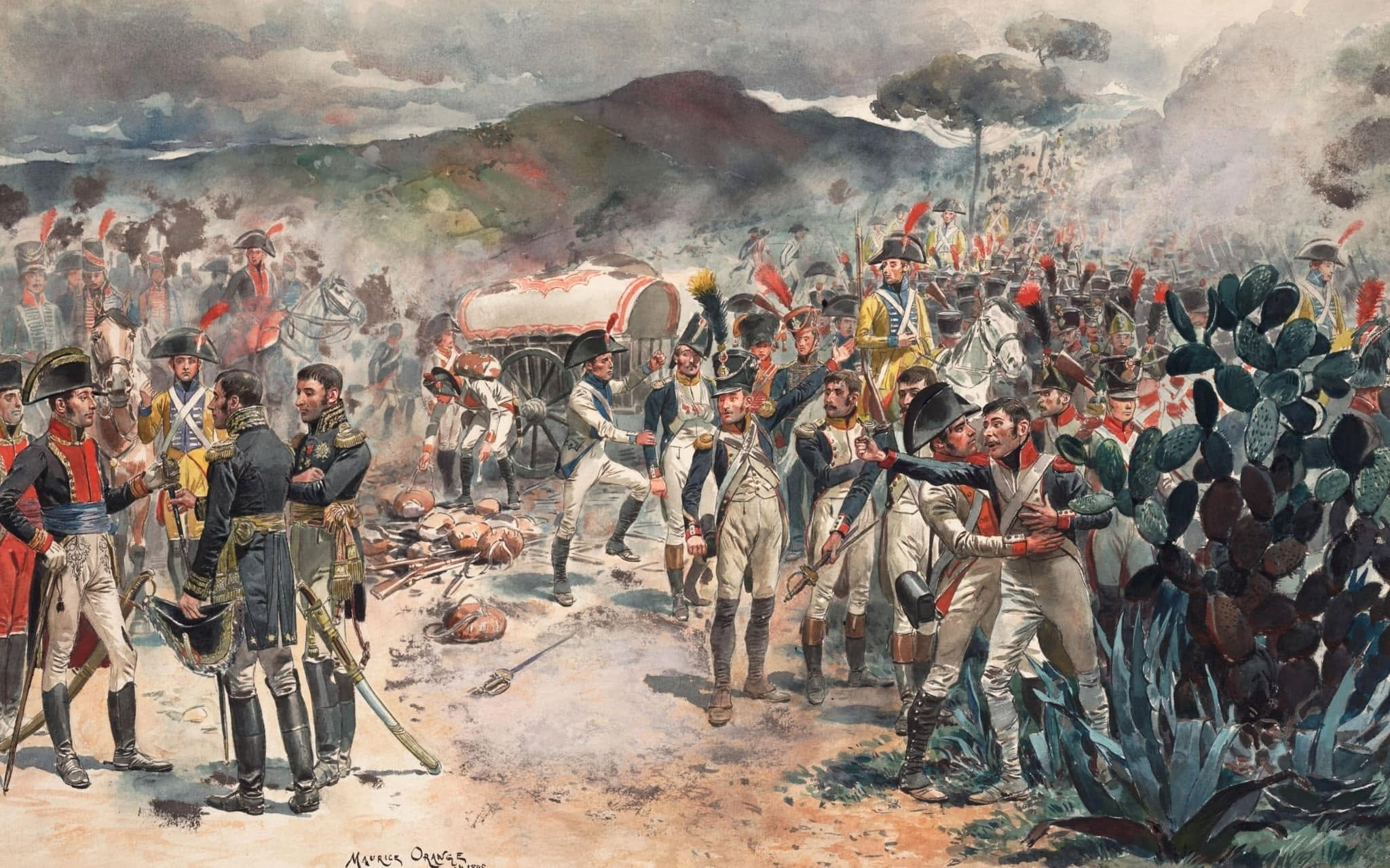
1906 painting of the French capitulation

Upon Castaños' arrival Dupont decided to call for a truce, negotiating terms with the Spanish officers over several days. After learning this, Vedel withdrew some distance along the highway. Spanish commanders threatened to massacre the French soldiers if this formation did not surrender, and Dupont compelled Vedel to return and lay down his arms. Handing his sword to Castaños, Dupont exclaimed, "You may well, General, be proud of this day; it is remarkable because I have never lost a pitched battle until now—I who have been in more than twenty." The Spaniard's biting reply: "It is the more remarkable because I was never in one before in my life."

== Aftermath ==
The Spanish conventional warfare proceeded with the Second siege of Girona.

=== Repercussions ===
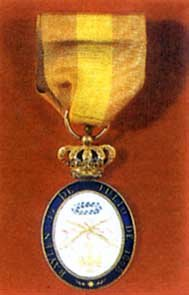
The Medalla de Bailén.

News of the victory rallied much of the vacillating Spanish elite to the insurrectionary movements surging across the country: Suddenly, the expulsion of the French by arms seemed possible, if not inevitable. At the same time, Spanish victory in an obscure Andalusian village signalled to the armies of Europe that the French, long considered invincible, could be beaten—a fact that persuaded the Austrian Empire to initiate the War of the Fifth Coalition against Napoleon:

This was a historic occasion; news of it spread like wildfire throughout Spain and then all Europe. It was the first time since 1801 that a sizable French force had laid down its arms, and the legend of French invincibility underwent a severe shaking. Everywhere anti-French elements drew fresh inspiration from the tidings. The Pope published an open denunciation of Napoleon; Prussian patriots were heartened; and, most significantly of all, the Austrian war party began to secure the support of Emperor Francis for a renewed challenge to the French Empire.

To commemorate a victory so rich in symbolic and propaganda value, the Seville Junta instituted the Medalla de Bailén.

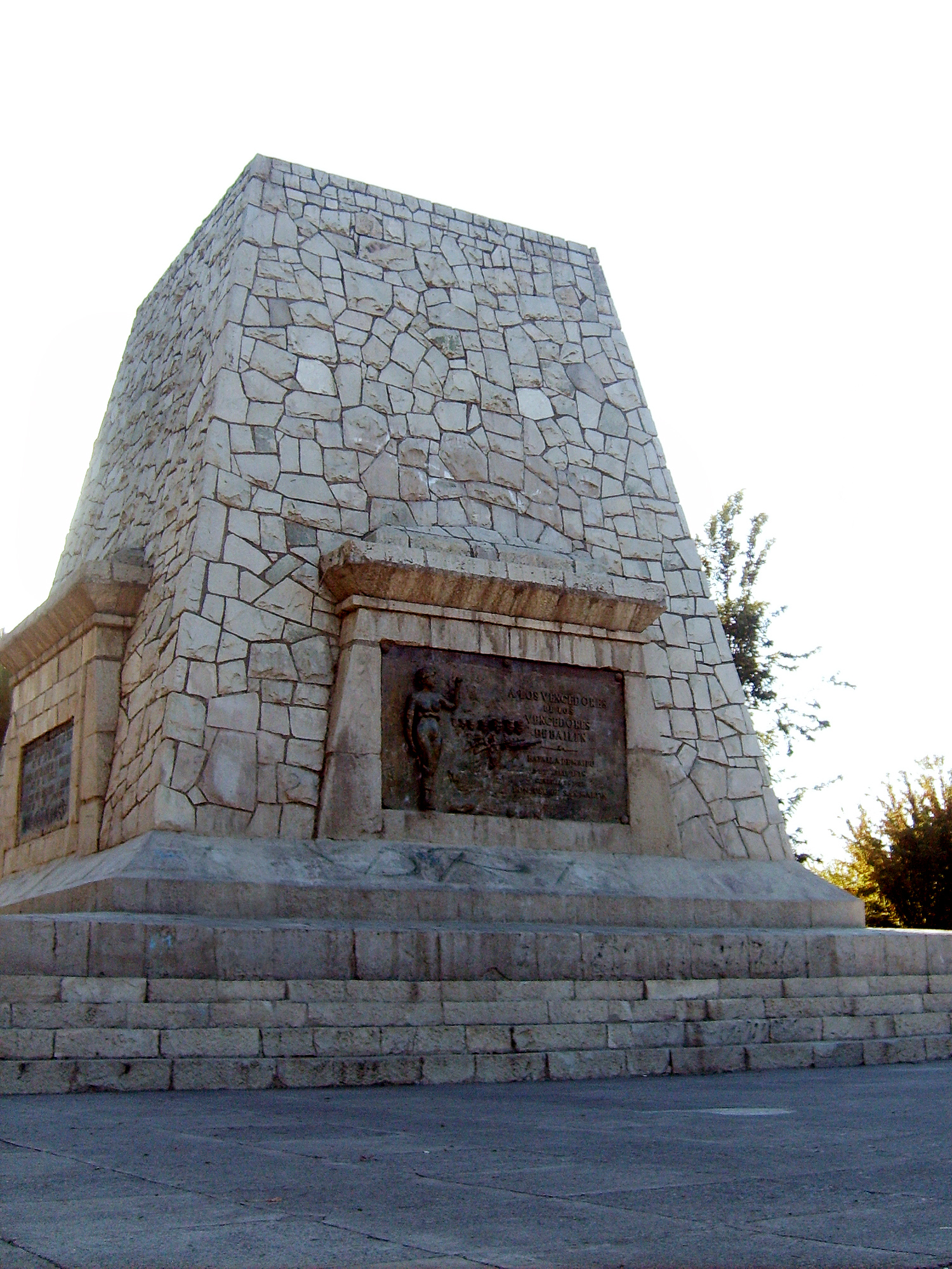
Chilean monument commemorating the triumph at Battle of Maipú. The inscription reads: a los Vencedores de los Vencedores de Bailén—to the Victors over the Victors of Bailén. During the Chilean War of Independence, the Chileans defeated Spanish soldiers that had fought at Bailén

The defeat mortified Napoleon. The Emperor treated Dupont's capitulation as a personal affront and a blight on the Imperial honour, pursuing a ruthless vendetta against all those involved:

Has there ever, since the world began, been such stupid, cowardly, idiotic business as this?

Dupont and Vedel returned to Paris in disgrace and were duly court-martialed, deprived of rank and title, and imprisoned at Fort de Joux for their role in the disaster. (Dupont was not paroled until the restoration of Louis XVIII; indeed, rumours persisted that he had been quietly assassinated in captivity.) None of the commanding officers, however slight their share of the responsibility, escaped without retribution: Napoleon held that his army in Spain had been "commanded by postal inspectors rather than generals." In January 1809, the Emperor halted a parade in Valladolid when he recognized Dupont's chief of staff among the commanders, scolding the unfortunate officer in full view of the troops and ordering him off the square. According to General Foy, Napoleon began his tirade: "What, general! did not your hand wither up when you signed that infamous capitulation?" Years later, Napoleon opened an inquiry into the Convention of Andujar under the mandate of the Imperial High Court, in camera, which turned out yet another proclamation against Dupont. An Imperial decree, dated 1 May 1812, prohibited any field commander to treat for capitulation and declared every unauthorized surrender a criminal act punishable by death.

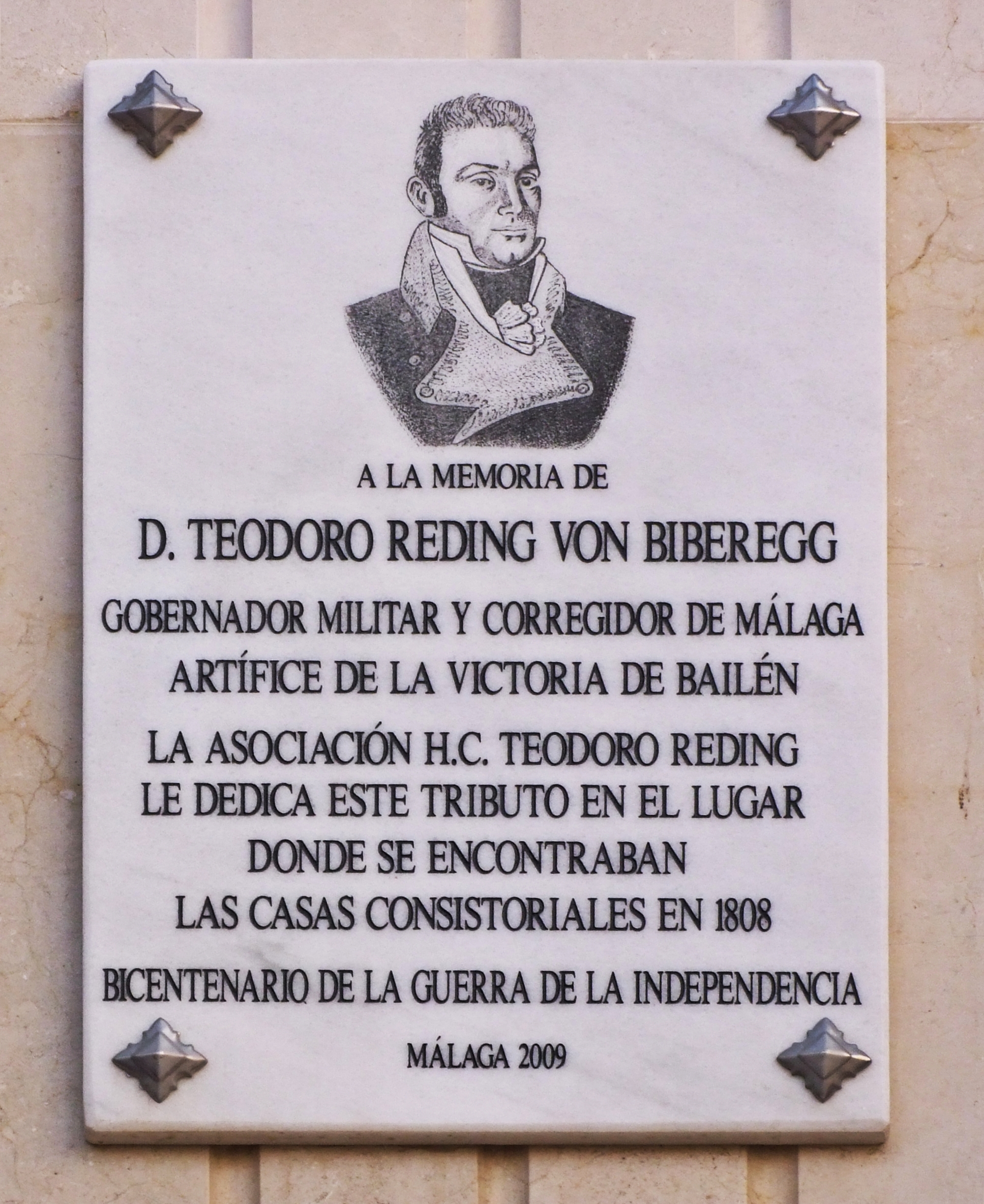
Plaque to the memory of General Reding at the Plaza de la Constitución, Málaga

=== French flight and recovery ===
Apart from the blow to French prestige, Bailén threw the French invasion forces—faltering after their failure to secure Gerona, Zaragoza, Valencia, Barcelona, and Santander, and with the country rapidly arming and mobilizing against them—into panic and disarray. With the sudden loss of 20,000 troops, Napoleon's military machine abruptly fell apart. On Savary's advice, Joseph fled from the openly hostile capital; joining him on the highway were Bessières and Moncey, who drew the French corps north from Madrid and continued past Burgos in what became a wholesale retreat. The French did not halt until they were safely over the Ebro, where they could set up secure defensive positions along the north bank and wait out events. From his makeshift headquarters at Vitoria, Joseph wrote to his brother gloomily: "I repeat that we have not a single Spanish supporter. The whole nation is exasperated and determined to fight." Napoleon, furious and dismayed, remarked that to cross the Ebro was "tantamount to evacuating Spain."

In November, Napoleon directed the bulk of the Grande Armée across the Pyrenees and dealt a series of devastating blows to the vacillating Spanish forces, receiving the surrender of Madrid in scarcely a month's time. Fate was particularly cruel to the victors of Bailén: Castaños was himself routed by Marshal Lannes at the Battle of Tudela in November 1808, while Reding was ridden down and trampled by the French cavalry at the Battle of Valls in 1809, dying of his wounds. Marshal Soult overran much of Andalusia the following year, and on 21 January 1810 his men recovered the lost Eagles from the cathedral of Bailén. Before long, only Cádiz remained firmly in Spanish hands, and a difficult war lay ahead to drive the invader from Spain.

=== Fate of the prisoners ===
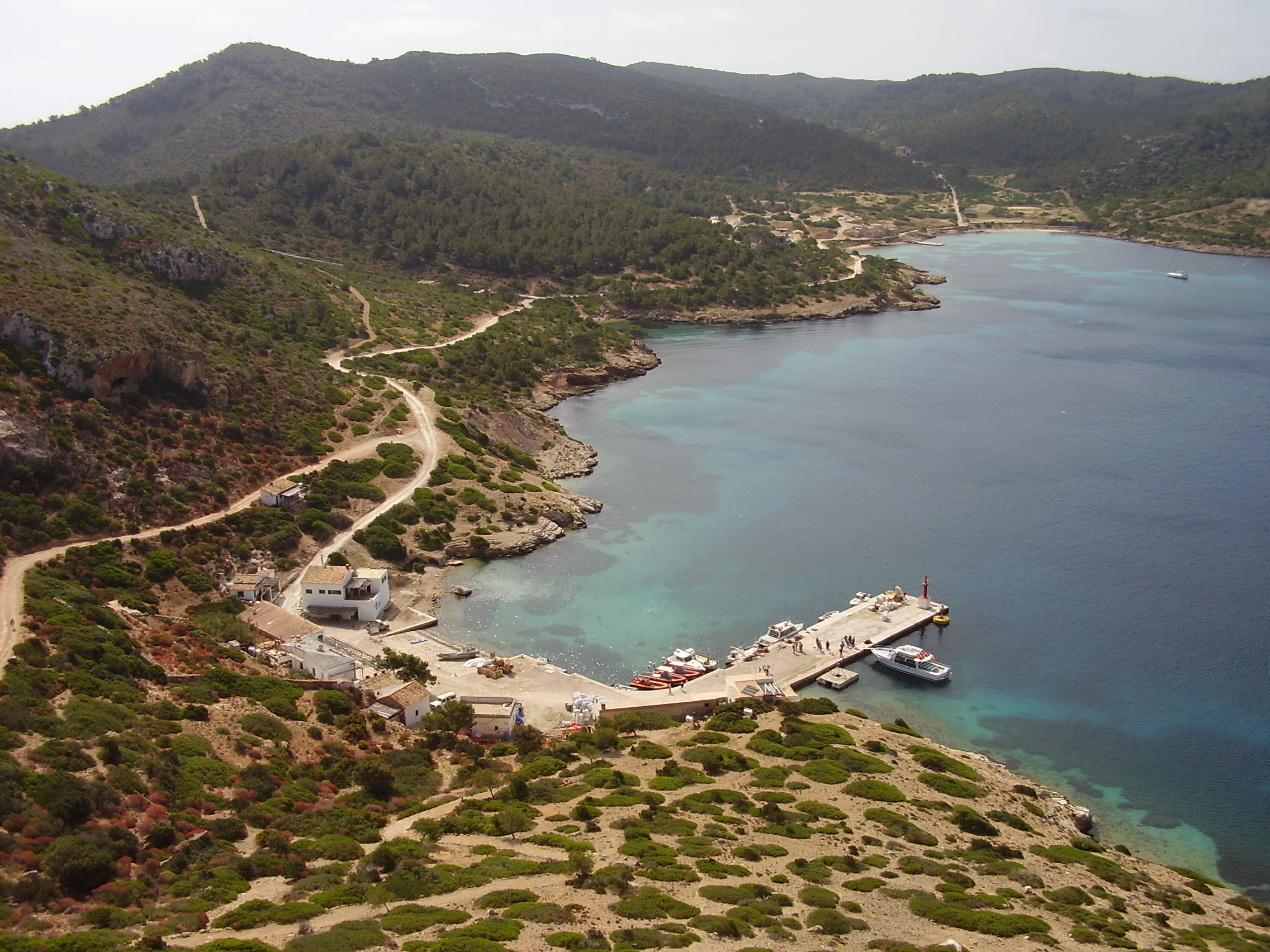
Cabrera Island

Dupont and his staff officers were transported on Royal Navy vessels to Rochefort harbour after the Seville Junta refused to honour the pact under which the French were to be repatriated via Cádiz. The French prisoners were kept in Cádiz harbor aboard prison hulks, old warships that had their masts and rigging removed. They were fed at irregular intervals on the overcrowded vessels. The start of the siege of Cádiz in 1810 meant that French troops occupied the land approaches to the city.

From 6 to 9 March 1810 a howling storm struck from the southwest and drove one Portuguese and three Spanish ships of the line ashore, where they were destroyed by French cannon fire. Thirty merchant ships were also sunk or driven ashore in the same tempest, including one vessel with 300 men of the British Army's 4th (The King's Own) Regiment of Foot, who became prisoners of war. The French officers, who were segregated aboard the Castilla, noted that vessels which had lost their anchors had drifted onto the opposite shore during the storm. During the next south-wester, on the night of 15 and 16 March, the officers overcame their Spanish guards and cut the prison hulk's cables. The French fought off the crews of two gunboats that tried to retake the vessel and over 600 escaped when the Castilla grounded on the French side of the bay. Ten days afterward, the prisoners on the Argonauta tried the same thing, but suffered a worse fate. The ship stuck fast on a bar out in the harbor and was taken under fire by several gunboats. At length the ship caught fire and fewer than half of the prisoners survived to be rescued by their compatriots. Several sailors later expressed their revulsion at having to shoot at escaping prisoners.

The few remaining officers were transferred first to Mallorca and later to England. The rank and file were sent to the Canary and Balearic Islands, where the inhabitants protested at the proximity of so many of their enemies. Consequently, 7,000 prisoners were put on the uninhabited island of Cabrera. The Spanish government, which could barely supply its own armies in the field, was unable to properly take care of the prisoners. Cannibalism was alleged to have occurred during times when the supply ships failed to arrive. On 6 July 1814, the remaining survivors of Bailén returned to France: fewer than half remained, most having perished in captivity. Many of the survivors never recovered their health after the experience.

=== Analysis ===
Bailén was a triumph for the Spanish Bourbon regime's regular army, successor to the tercios, which Napoleon had derided as "the worst in Europe" (while dismissing the Spanish militia as packs of "bandits led by monks"). Castaños conceded that the greater part of his troops had been "raw and inexperienced; but they were Spaniards, and Spaniards are heroes" and indeed this maligned army, largely untouched by French Revolutionary innovations—a relic of 18th-century absolutism—outfought the Imperial citizen-soldiers.

Spain's ancien regime military, however, was soon eclipsed by the growing scale of the war—crippled by the infusion of untrained conscripts and caught up in the competing designs of the juntas. "Not only had many officers perished in the uprising of May 1808, but the authority of the army had been severely reduced and the autonomy of the military estate invaded in an unprecedented manner. Following the uprising, meanwhile, new officers and old had found themselves waging a desperate war against a powerful aggressor in the most unfavourable circumstances. Hostile to military discipline, the troops had been prone to riot and desertion just as the populace had done all it could to resist the draft. Meanwhile, unscrupulous and irresponsible propagandists had created false expectations of victory, whilst equally unscrupulous and irresponsible politicians had interfered in the conduct of military operations, failed to supply the army with the sinews of war, fomented alternative structures of military organisation that hindered the war effort as much as they assisted it, and made general after general scapegoats for disasters which were often none of their making."

Subsequent attempts to replicate Bailén proved particularly dangerous for Spanish units recruited and equipped in the chaos of French military occupation and counterinsurgency: "The raw levies that formed the bulk of the Spanish forces proved incapable of manoeuvring in the face of the enemy, whilst many of them barely knew how to use their weapons, having sometimes only been issued with muskets the day before they went into action." These untrained recruits typically broke ranks when assaulted by the French regulars, "accusing their commanders of treason and leaving the few [Spanish] regulars involved to fend for themselves as best they could. Having run away, meanwhile, the levies invariably exposed themselves to the French cavalry, which were unleashed amongst them with terrible effect, sabring them unmercifully and taking hundreds of them prisoner." Wellington, as allied commander, would inherit this "Bailén syndrome" and attempt to restrain the ardour of the Spanish under his command:

So brilliant was the victory and so simple the encircling manoeuvre, that Wellesley later on had great difficulty in getting 'Baylen' out of the Spaniards' system. He used to say jocularly before every engagement: "Now this is not Baylen—don't attempt to make it a battle of Baylen!"

== Battle of Bailén in literature ==
- Benito Pérez Galdós used this battle as the framework for the book "Bailén" of his Episodios Nacionales series.
- F. L. Lucas's novel The English Agent – A Tale of the Peninsular War (1969), the account of a British Army officer gathering information before the first British landings, is about the Battle of Bailén and its aftermath.
- Ángel de Saavedra, 3rd Duke of Rivas, wrote a poem about the battle titled "Bailén".

== See also ==
- Timeline of the Peninsular War
- María Bellido

== Bibliography ==
- Chandler, David (1966). The Campaigns of Napoleon. Weidenfeld and Nicolson. ISBN 9780025236608.
- Esdaile, Charles J. (2003). The Peninsular War: A New History. Macmillan. ISBN 978-1-4039-6231-7.
- Fernández, José Gregorio Cayuela (2008). La Guerra de la Independencia: Historia Bélica, Pueblo y Nación en España, 1808-1814. Universidad de Salamanca. ISBN 978-84-7800-334-1.
- Foy, Maximilien Sebastien (1827). History of the war in the peninsula, under Napoleon. Vol. II. Palgrave MacMillan.
- Gates, David (1986). The Spanish Ulcer: A History of the Peninsular War. W W Norton & Co. ISBN 0-393-02281-1.
- Glover, Michael (1974). The Peninsular War 1807–1814: A Concise Military History. Penguin Classic Military History (published 2001). ISBN 0-14-139041-7.
- Hamilton, Thomas (1829). Annals of the Peninsular Campaigns: From MDCCCVIII to MDCCCXIV. W. Blackwood.
- Larchey, Lorédan (1884). Les suites d'une capitulation: relations des captifs de Baylen et de la glorieuse retraite du 116e régiment. Imp. Th. Lombaerts.
- Longford, Elizabeth (1970). Wellington. New York, Harper & Row.
- Napier, William (1831). History of the War in the Peninsula. Vol. I. Frederic Warne and Co.
- Oman, Charles William Chadwick (1908). A History of the Peninsular War: Sep. 1809 – Dec. 1810. Vol. III. Oxford: Clarendon Press.
- Toreno, José María Queipo de Llano Ruiz de Saravía, conde de (1835). Historia del levantamiento, guerra y revolución de España. Vol. I. Madrid Impr. de T. Jordan.
- Tucker, Spencer C. (2009). A Global Chronology of Conflict: From the Ancient World to the Modern Middle East [6 volumes]. ABC-CLIO. p. 1061. ISBN 978-1-85109-672-5.
- Vela, Francisco (2007). La batalla de Bailén, 1808 : el águila derrotada (1a ed.). Madrid: Almena Ediciones. ISBN 9788496170766.

Preceded by Battle of Medina de Rioseco	Napoleonic Wars; Battle of Bailén	Succeeded by Battle of Roliça
