= Despeñaperros =

Despeñaperros Natural Park
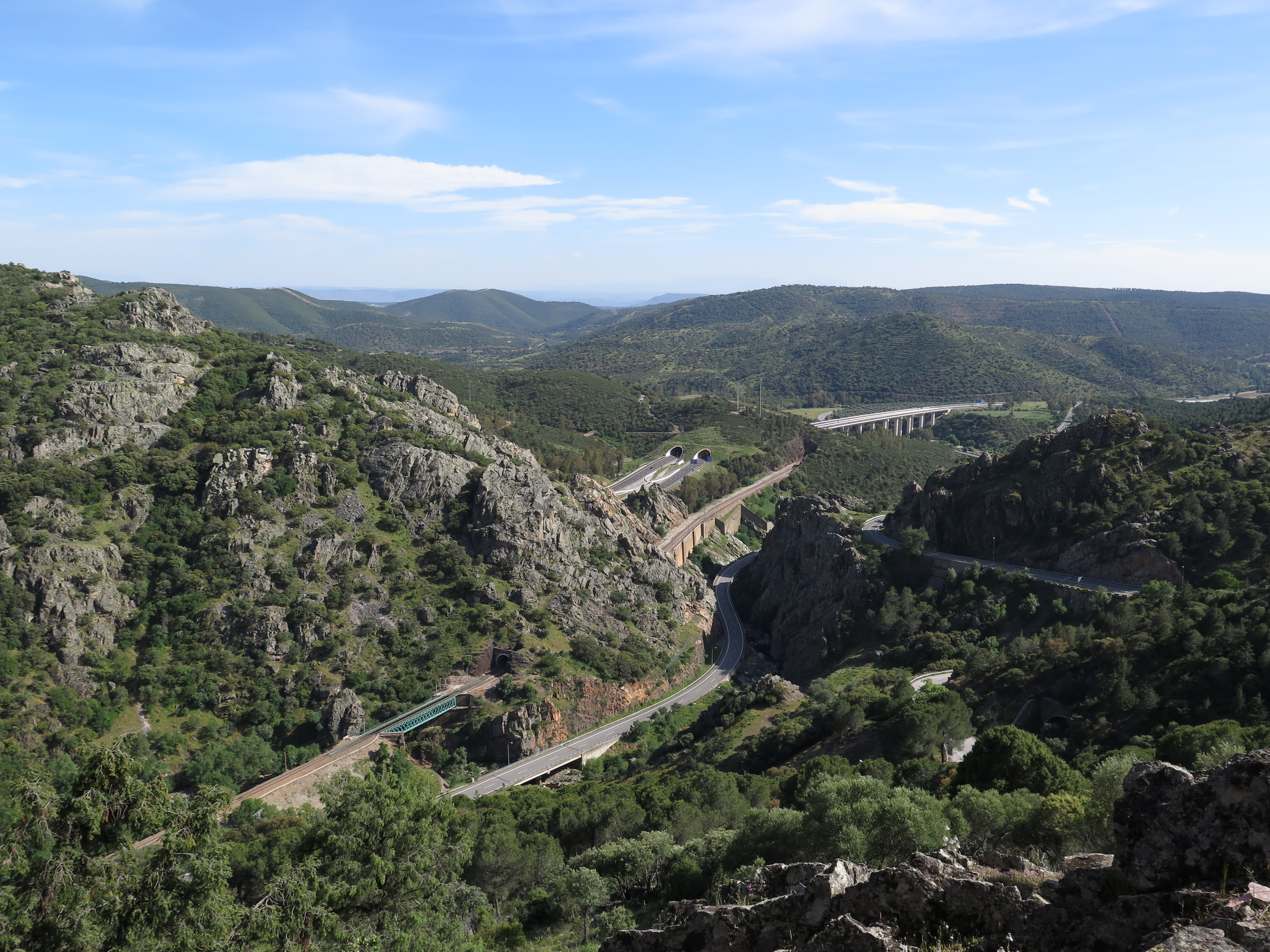
- Interactive map of Despeñaperros Natural Park
- Location: Andalusia, Spain
- Coordinates: 38°23′10″N 3°30′25″W
- Area: 76.49 square kilometres (29.53 sq mi)
- Established: 1989
- Governing body: Ministry of the Environment

Despeñaperros (literally, [cliff where] dogs plunge) is a gorge or canyon carved out by the Despeñaperros river. It is located in the municipality of Santa Elena in the northern portion of the province of Jaén, Spain. The 76.49-square-kilometre (29.53 sq mi) area was declared a natural park by the Andalusian Autonomous Government, primarily for its geology and landscape, but also for its notable flora and fauna.

The gorge has steep walls, some more than 500 metres (1,600 ft) in height. It has historically been much used by humans as a natural pass through the Sierra Morena, constituting a principal path of connection between Andalusia and the Meseta Central, Castile-La Mancha, and the rest of Spain. Today the Despeñaperros is the route of the Autovía A-4 and of one of Andalusia's most important railway connections to the rest of Spain. Until the 1992 construction of the high-speed Puertollano–Córdoba route (90 kilometres (56 mi) to the west), this rail route was second in importance only to the Mérida–Seville line in terms of connecting from Andalusia to the rest of Spain.

== Geology ==
The Sierra de Despeñaperos is located at the eastern limit of the Sierra Morena. The mountain range is oriented east–west, but is crossed by some rivers oriented north–south, so that some zones of the Meseta Central drain south to the Guadalquivir and thence to the Atlantic Ocean, crossing the theoretical natural barrier of the range. One of these is the Despeñaperros river, but the Guarrizas also crosses 11 kilometres (6.8 mi) to the east, forming the beautiful Cimbarra Falls, protected as a paraje natural. The Despeñaperros flows into the Guarrizas about 10 kilometres (6.2 mi) south of the gorge.

The vertical walls of the gorge expose geological layers that reveal the history of the surrounding land. The walls are composed of extremely hard "Armorican" quartzite, formed in the ocean 500 million years ago in the Paleozoic, which were later covered by more recent materials. In the Carboniferous these were elevated and exposed to erosion, finally to be discovered here and at Cimbarra Falls. According to the prevailing theory, it took some 320 million years of the Variscan orogeny for the continental collision of Laurasia and Gondwana to crush the Armorican continent.

In the strata of Armorican quartzite some spectacular ripples or crinkles are visible, fossil effects of waves, similar to those that can be observed in any deep, sandy sea, which reveals their origin. Trace fossils also remain of organisms that left their mark in the sandy sediments during the Ordovician, almost 500 years ago.

Among the formations visible in Despeñaperros are several that have been given names of their own: El Salto del Fraile ("Friar's Leap"), Las Correderas ("The Slides"), or Los Órganos ("The Organs"). In this last, the quartzite had been folded until it stood in vertical strata, which erosion then gave the forms of pointed tubes, evoking the musical instrument the organ. Los Órganos has status as a natural monument in its own right.

== Flora ==
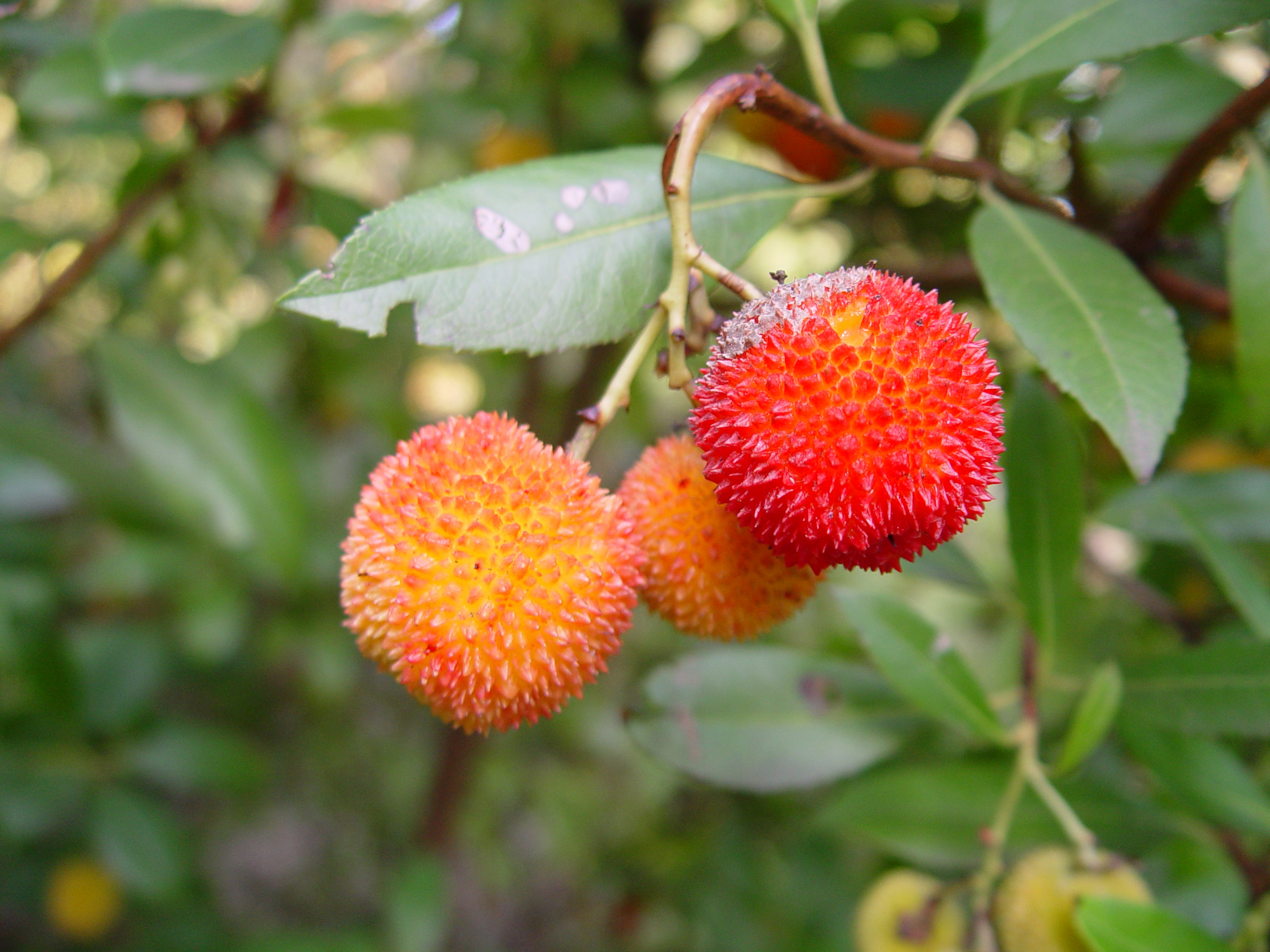
Strawberry tree

Like the rest of the eastern Sierra Morena, the Despeñaperros is dominated by Mediterranean forest. Holm oak (Quercus ilex) and cork oak (Quercus suber) predominate, along with Portuguese oak (Quercus faginea), Pyrenean oak (Quercus pyrenaica) and various pines: stone pine (Pinus pinea), Aleppo pine (Pinus halepensis), and European black pine (Pinus nigra). The predominant shrubs are strawberry trees (Arbutus unedo), heather (genus Erica), rockroses of the genus Cistus, myrtle (genus Myrtus) and kermes oak (Quercus coccifera).

There are also riparian forests along the various rivers and streams, shadier and more humid, with alders (genus Alnus), ash (genus Fraxinus) and willows (genus Salix).

The natural park also holds 30 endemic species or subspecies unique in the world, and others unique in the Iberian Peninsula.

== Fauna ==
There is an important presence of deer (Cervidae) and wild boars (Sus scrofa); there are authorized hunts of both. There are also Iberian lynxes (Lynx pardinus) and wolves, as well as small carnivores such as foxes, Egyptian mongooses (Herpestes ichneumon) and wildcats (Felis silvestris).

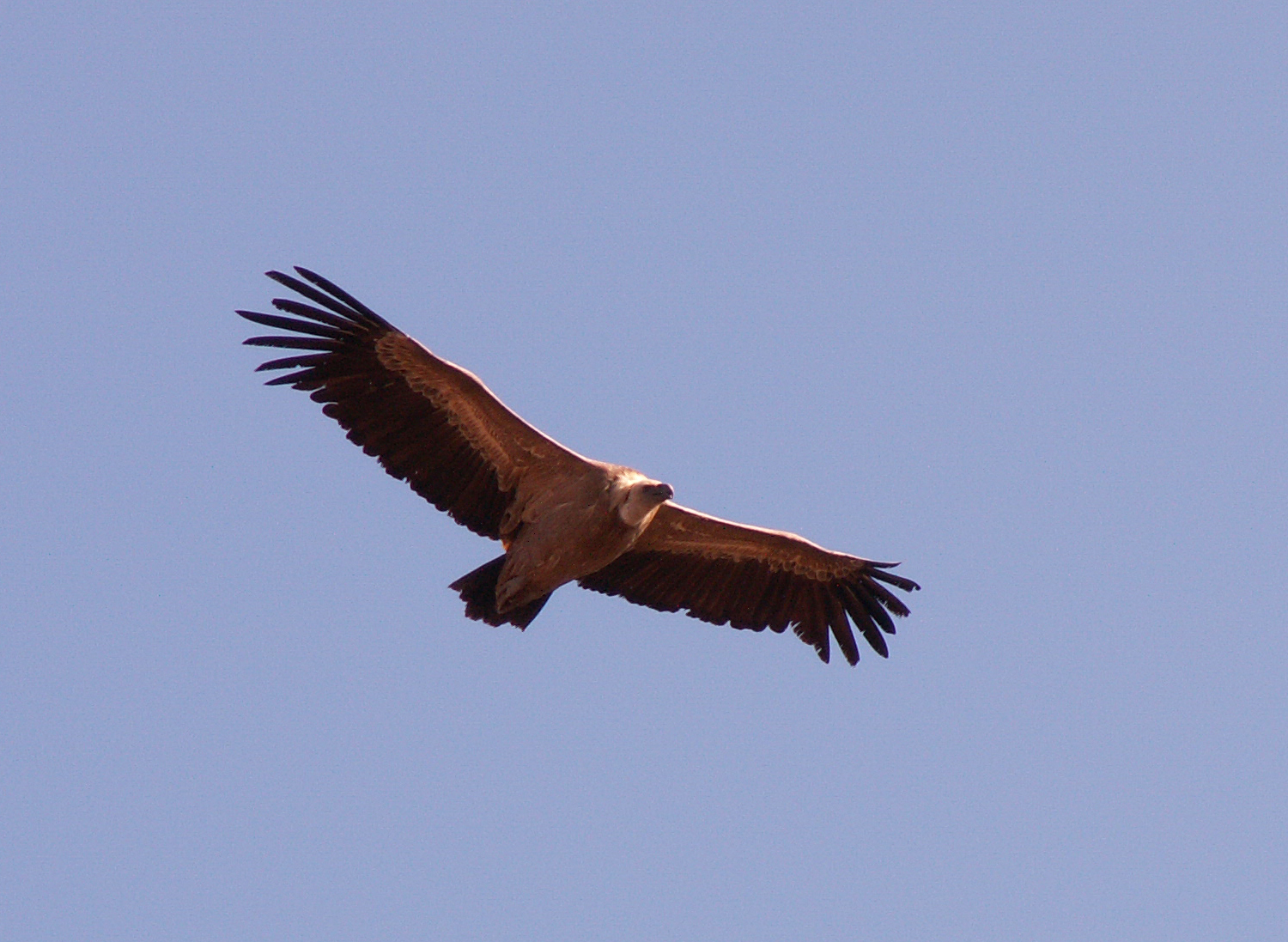
Griffon vulture

Birds in Despeñaperros include the Spanish imperial eagle (Aquila adalberti, also known as Adalbert's eagle) and the griffon vulture (Gyps fulvus).

== History ==
=== Early history ===
As well as the Cimbarra Falls and the caves in the area, Despeñaperros has important examples of Neolithic cave painting, proof that humans have long been aware of these passages between the Meseta Central and Andalusia. Notable among the area's caves are the Cueva de los Muñecos and the Cuevas de las Vacas del Rematoso. During the Iron Age, local caves were often use for depositing bronze votive offerings for the local gods. Many are now in the National Archaeological Museum in Madrid but a representative sample is kept in the British Museum in London.

Separating as it does the central part of Spain from the south of the peninsula, the Sierra Morena and its defiles have always had great military importance. The remains of a Roman road lead to the ruins of the castle of Castro Ferral (the name castro being a sign of its antiquity). The castle was later occupied by the Almohads until it was captured and garrisoned by Alfonso VIII's troops on 18 July 1212, following the Battle of the Navas de Tolosa.

=== Peninsular War ===
During the Peninsular War, especially during the first weeks of June 1808, Napoleon's troops had great difficulty in maintaining fluid communications between Madrid and Andalusia, mainly due to the activity of guerrilleros in the Sierra Morena. The first attack around Despeñaperros took place on 5 June 1808, when two squadrons of French dragoons were attacked at the northern entrance to the pass and forced to retreat to the nearby town of Almuradiel. On 19 June General Vedel was ordered to head south from Toledo with a division of 6,000 men, 700 horses and 12 guns to force a passage over the Sierra Morena, hold the mountains from the guerrillas and link up with Dupont, pacifying Castile-La Mancha along the way. Vedel was joined during the march by small detachments under Generals Roize and Ligier-Belair. On 26 June 1808 Vedel's column defeated Lieutenant-Colonel Valdecaños' detachment of Spanish regulars and guerrillas with six guns blocking the mountain pass of Puerta del Rey and the following day met up with Dupont at La Carolina, reestablishing military communications with Madrid after a month of disruption. Finally, General Gobert's division set out from Madrid on 2 July to reinforce Dupont. However, only one brigade of his division ultimately reached Dupont, the rest being needed to hold the road north against the guerrillas.

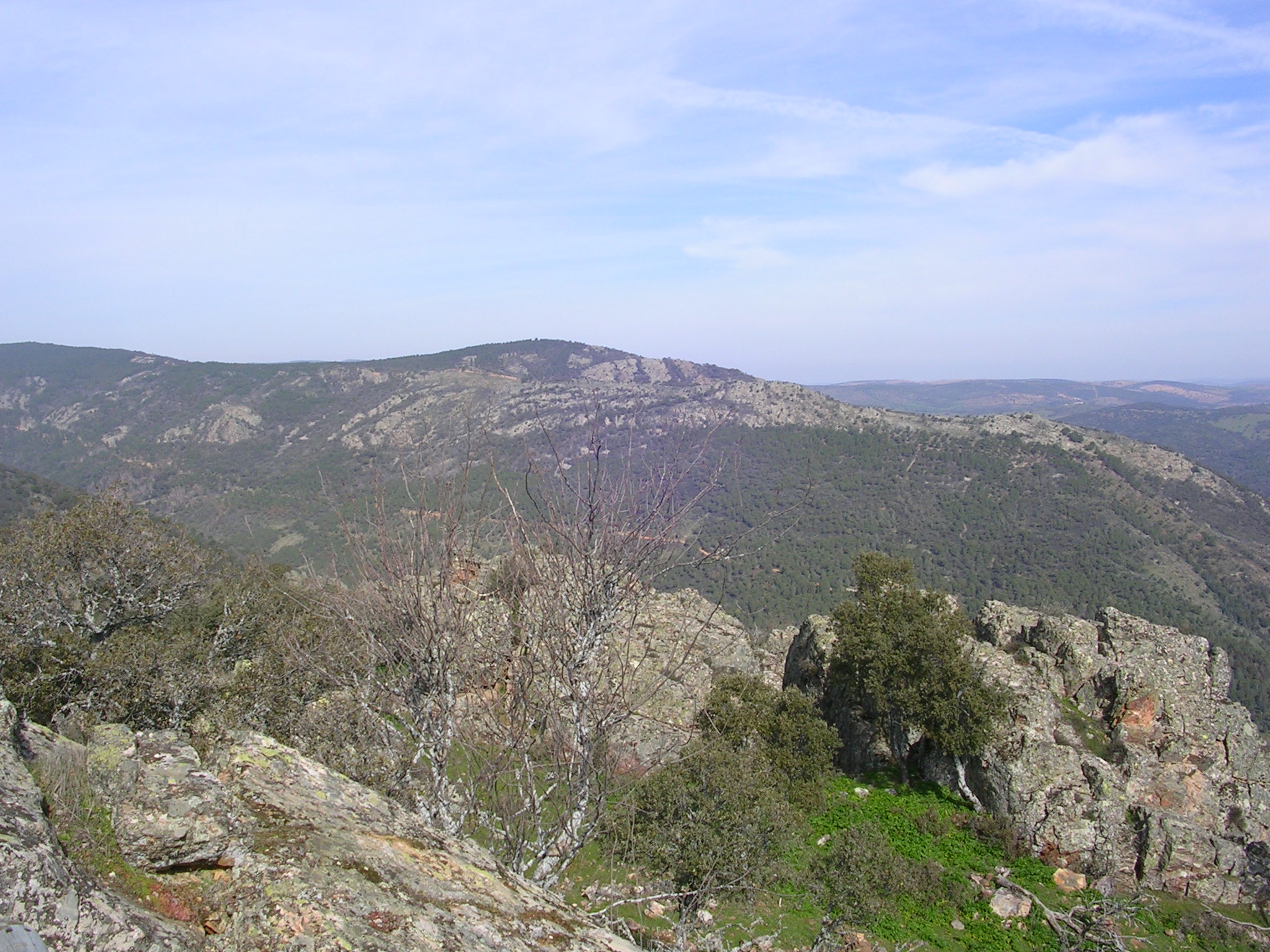
General view of the Despeñaperros Natural Park

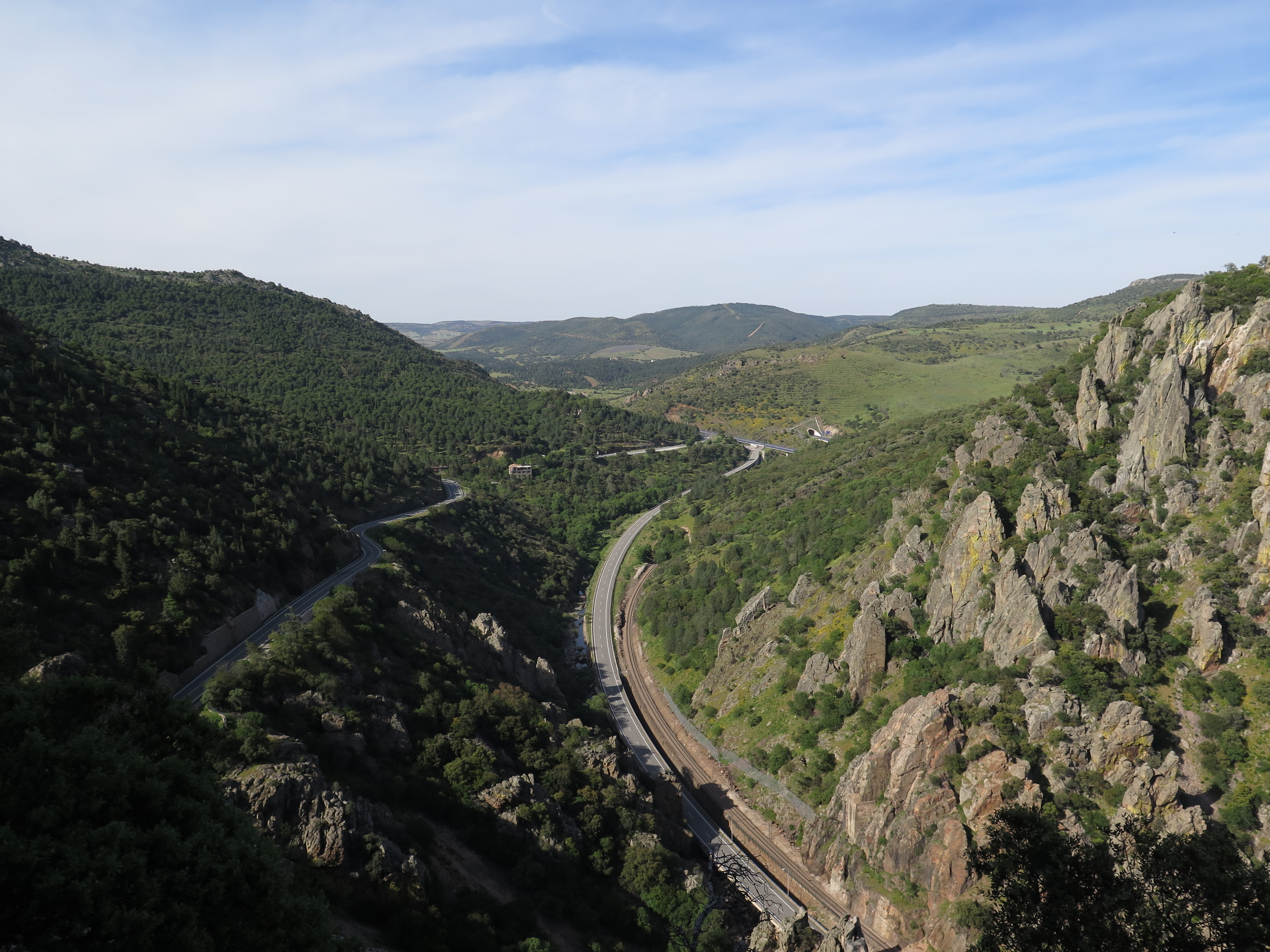
Despeñaperros path, sight to La Mancha

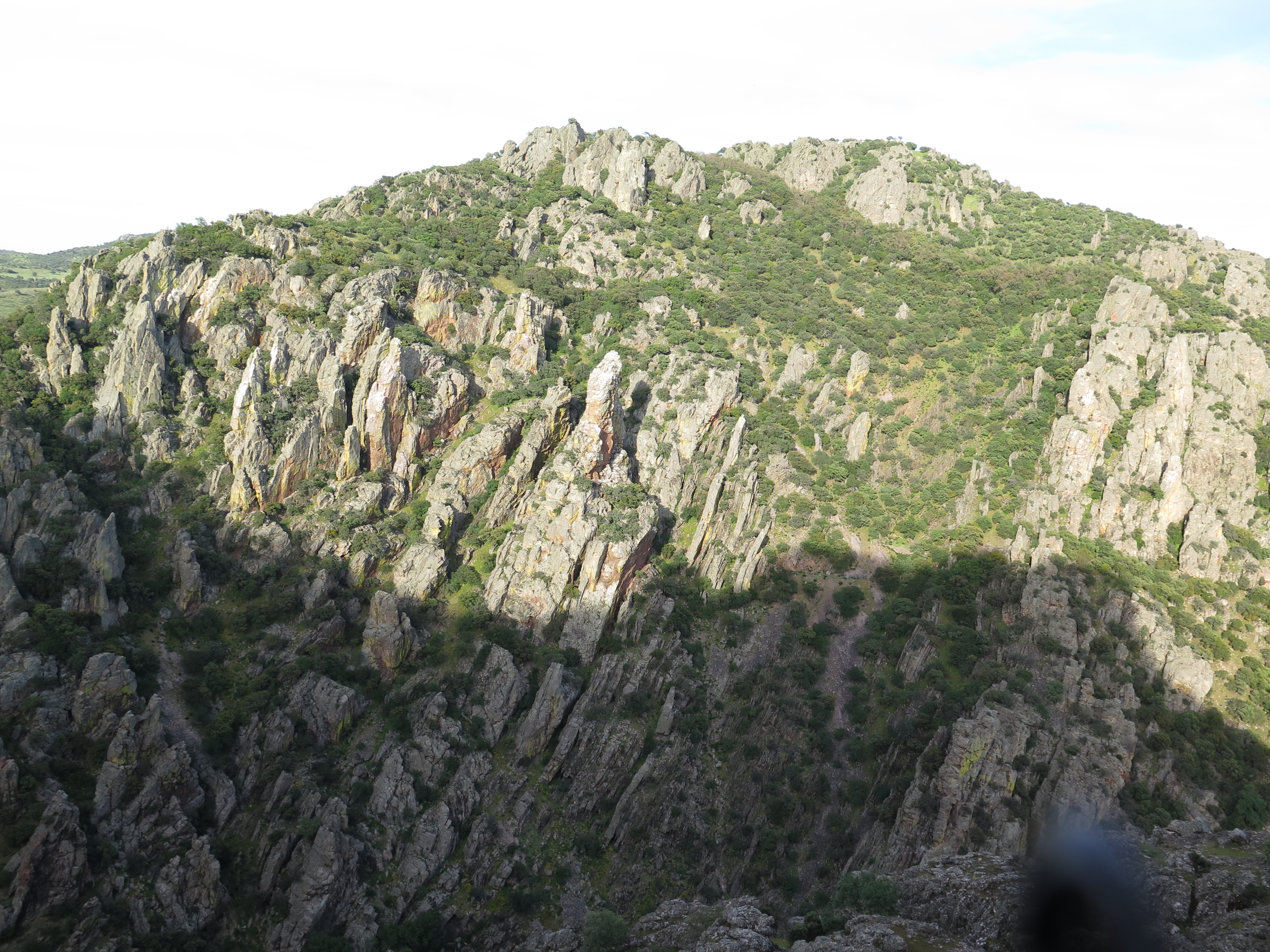
Natural Monument of Los Órganos

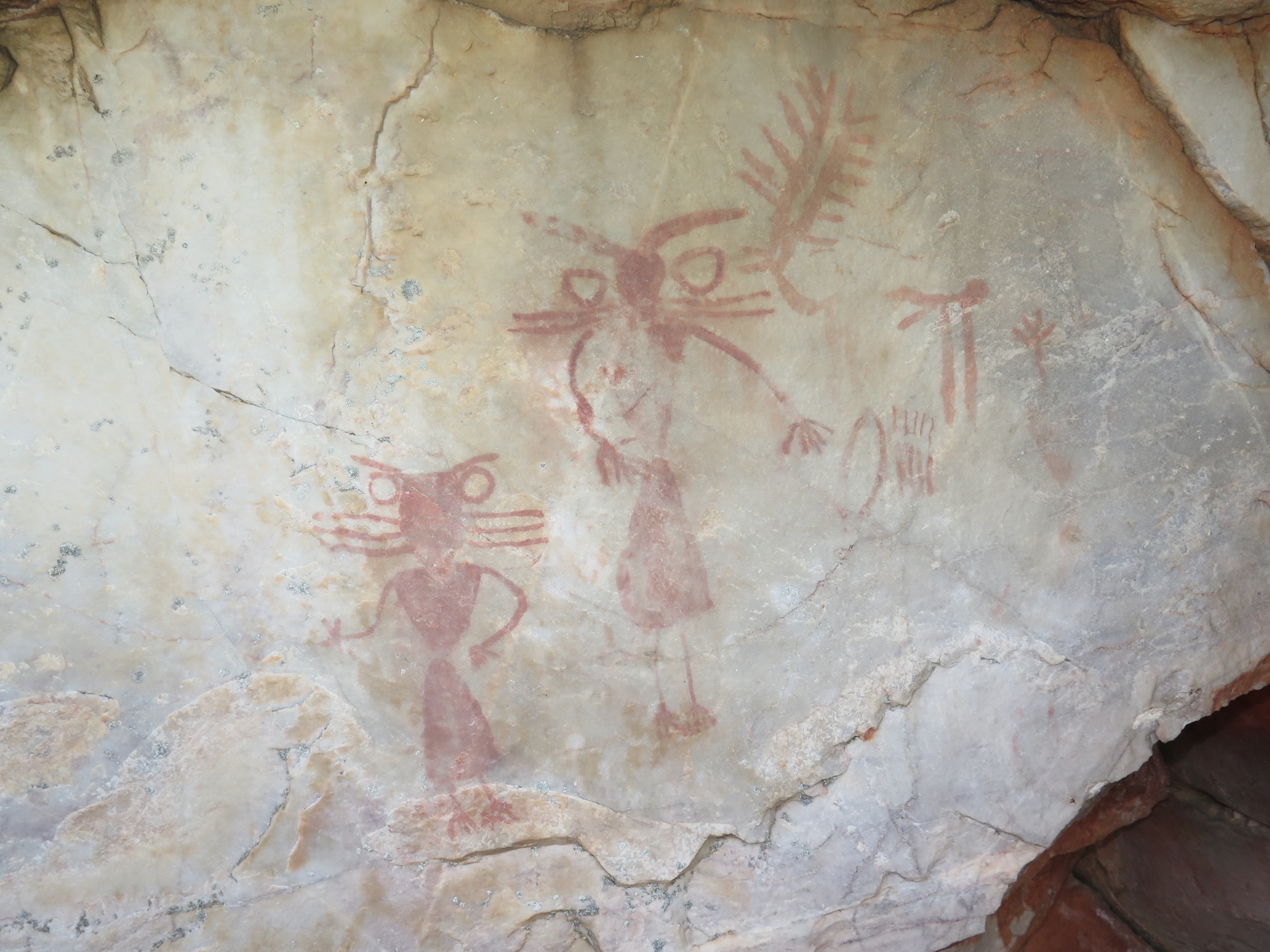
Cave paintings: Anthropomorphic and zoomorphic depictions in one hillside of "Los Órganos"

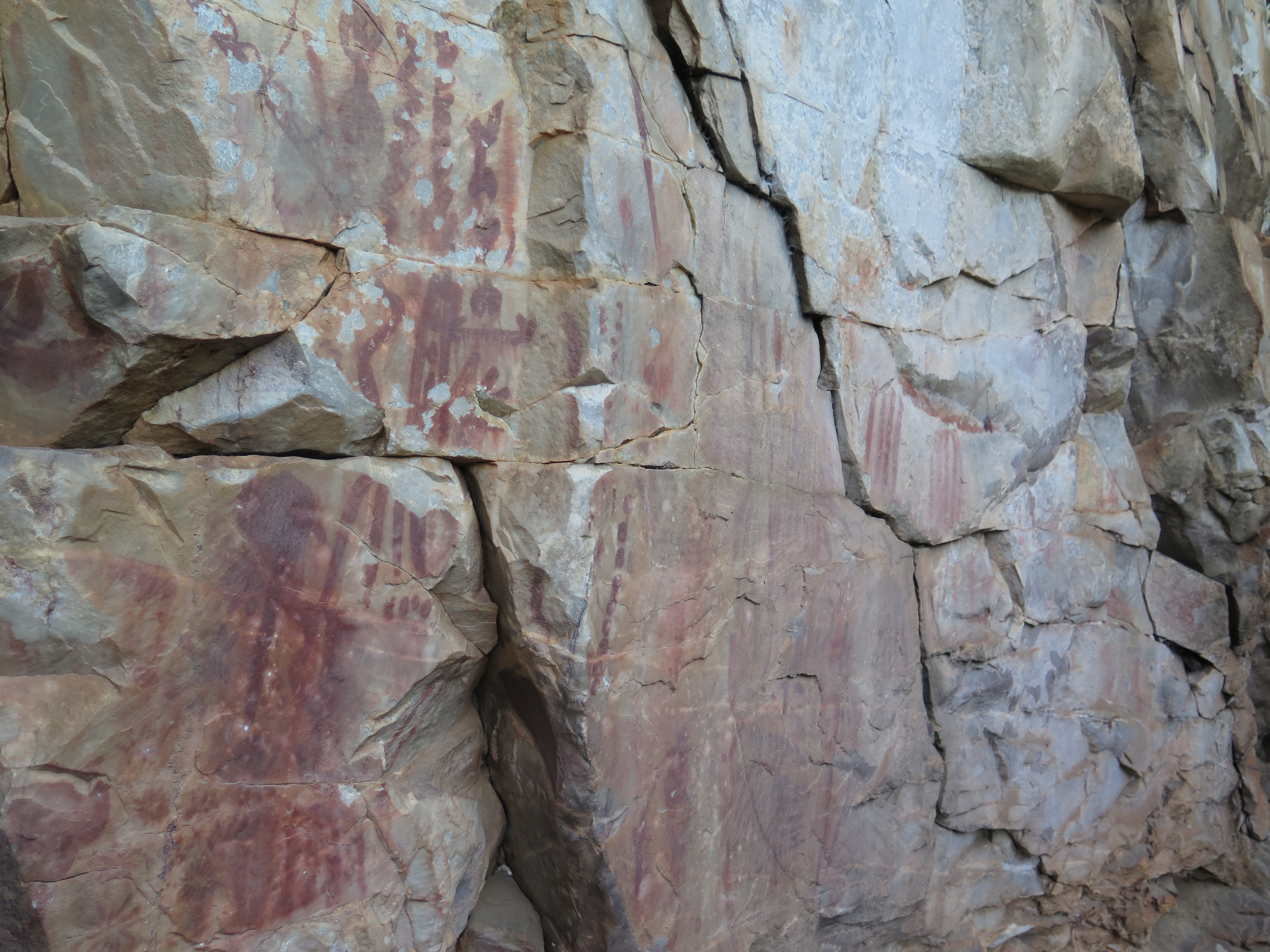
Cave paintings: Vertical lines and different figures

== See also ==
- Despeñaperros Pass
