= Louis Liger-Belair =

French general (1766–1833)

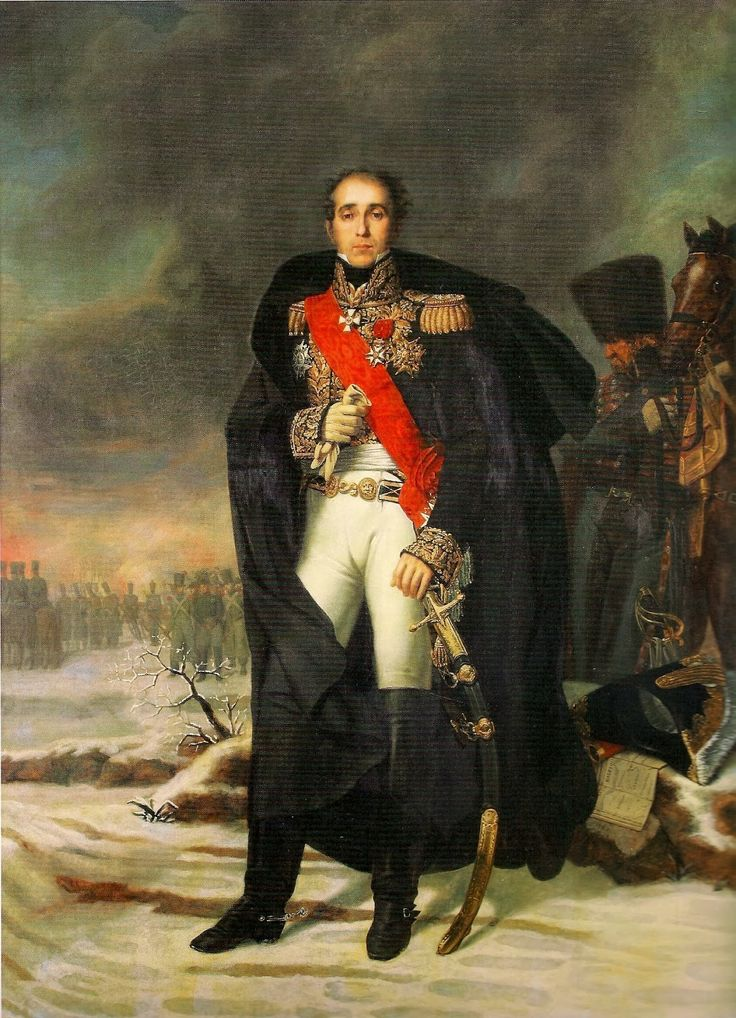
- Born: 11 July 1772; Aube, Vandoeuvres, France
- Died: 4 December 1835 (aged 63); Vosne-Romanée, France
- Military career
- Allegiance: French Republic; French Empire
- Branch: Cavalry
- Rank: Général de division
- Conflicts: French Revolutionary Wars; Napoleonic Wars
- Awards: comte d'Empire; Name inscribed under the Arc de Triomphe; Légion d'honneurOrder of Saint Louis

Louis Liger-Belair (Note: Also spelled Ligier-Belair (Oman, 1911).) (French pronunciation: [lwi liʒ(j)e bəlɛʁ]; 1772–1835) was a French général de division.

== Peninsular War ==
He was promoted to général de brigade in 1808 and to général de division in July 1811.

His troops were defeated by Reding at Mengibar, during the Battle of Bailén (July 1808), where he and Gobert, who had come to his aid and was mortally wounded during the battle, were outnumbered by two to one. This defeat, together with Gobert's death, were instrumental to Dupont changing his battle plan and dividing his forces in two, thereby losing the battle.

At Talavera (July 1809), his brigades formed part of Sebastiani's division.

In 1811, he led a 10,947-strong division of Sebastiani's 4th Corps, incorporated in Soult's Army of the South.

== Post-war career ==
In October 1814, Liger-Belair was given the command of the 4th military division of Nancy.

Liger-Belair did not participate in the "Hundred Days" (1815) and the king, Louis XVIII, later named him viscount and gave him the command of the 2nd military division of Châlons.

In 1823, he had the command of the 5th military division.
