= María Inés Juliana Bellido Vallejos =

Spanish heroine

María Bellido
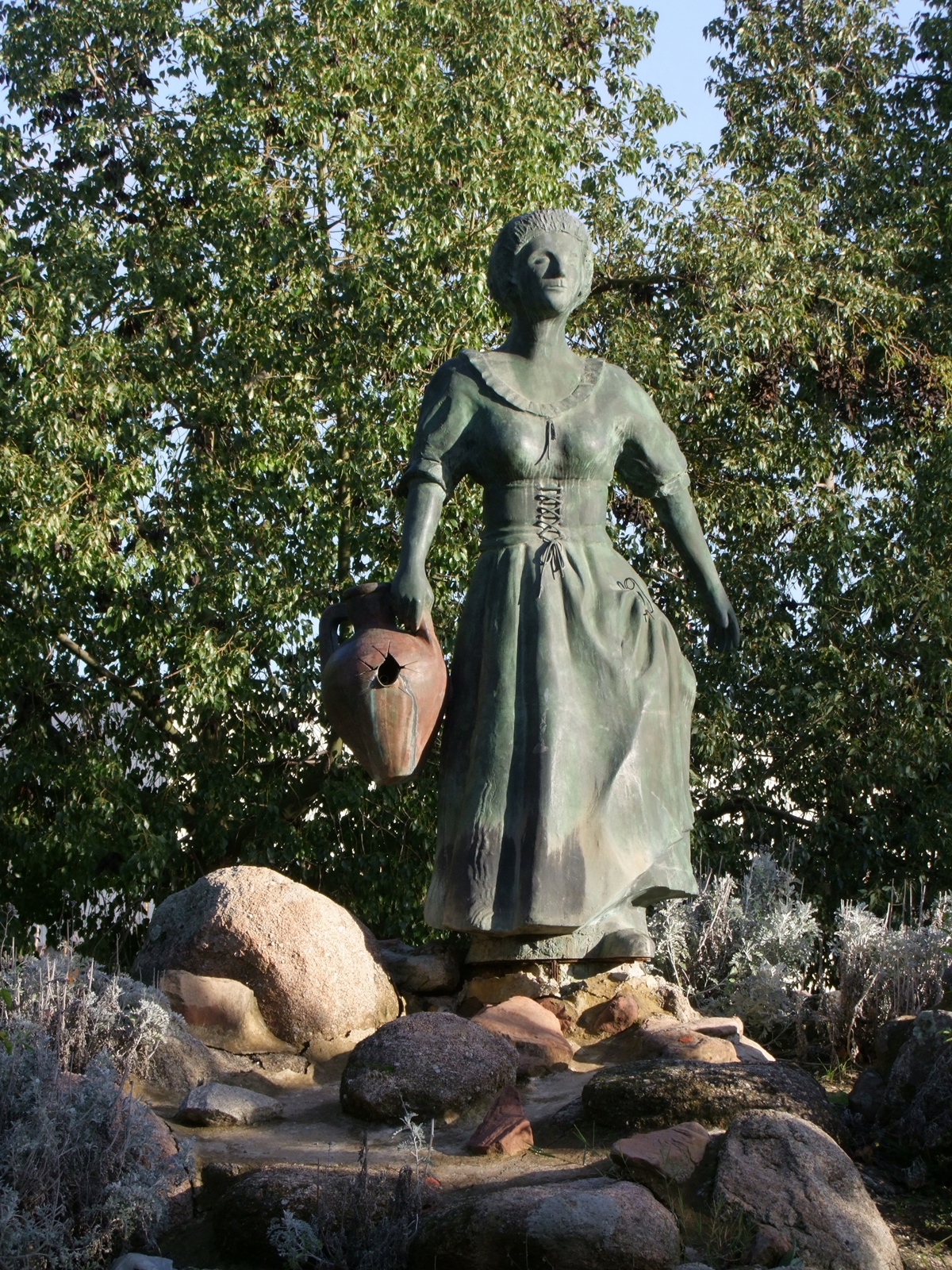
- Maria Bellido, at the Battle of Bailén (19 July 1808)
- Born: 28 January 1755; Porcuna, Spain
- Died: 7 March 1809 (aged 54)
- Burial place: Parish of the Incarnation
- Occupation: Water carrier
- Known for: Bravery in battle
- Spouse: Luis Domingo Cobo Muela

María Inés Juliana Bellido Vallejos (28 January 1755 – 7 March 1809), widely known as María Bellido was a legendary Spanish heroine of the War of Independence, specifically during the Battle of Bailén of 1808, against Napoleon's army.

== Biography ==
María was born in the town of Porcuna in Jaén, one of nine children of Francisco Elías Bellido and Catalina Ballejos. She married Luis Domingo Cobo Muela, a pottery seller from Bailén and moved there with him.

Legend has it that, during the Battle of Bailén, she joined other women from the town in serving the soldiers by carrying water to them. The temperature that day was around 45 °C (113 °F). In the midst of the attack, she climbed up to the command post carrying a jug of water and offered it to General Teodoro Reding. But as she offered him the vessel, a bullet broke the jug. Without flinching, Bellido gathered what was left of the jug, which still held some water, and offered it to the general, who praised her actions and offered to reward her.

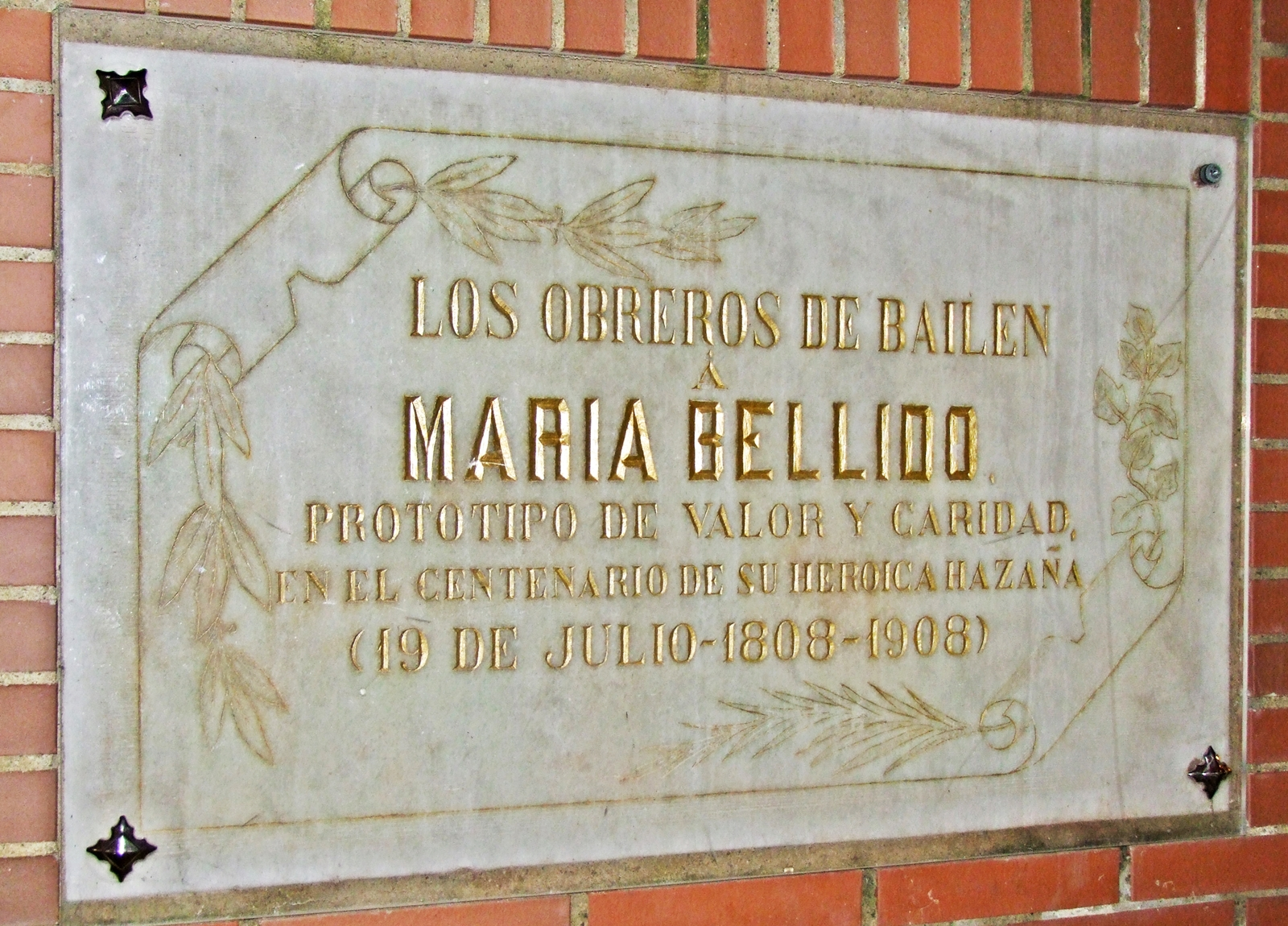
Plaque in Calle María Bellido.

Her bravery became a symbol of the popular resistance of the town of Bailén. From then on, a perforated pitcher pouring water was prominently displayed on Bailén's coat of arms.

According to one scholar, "The unruffled, serene demeanor of María Bellido—a native of Bailén—at the moment a bullet shattered the pitcher she was offering to General Reding elevated the water-carrier’s routine task of serving the troops to the status of a heroic act; this act mythologized the first major victory over the enemy at the Battle of Bailén, on that sweltering July morning in 1808 in Andalusia."

Bailén's crest showing battle weapons and Bellido's broken jug.

She died on 7 March 1809 and was buried with her husband at the Parish of the Incarnation in Bailén.
