= Bailén =

- Municipality
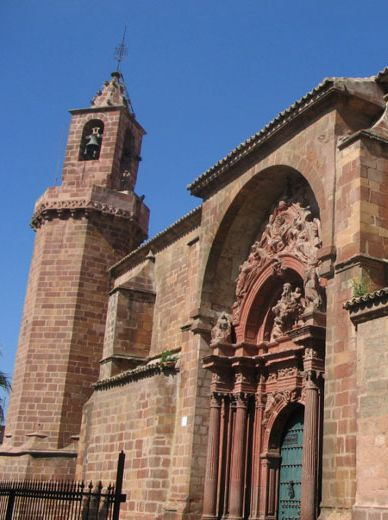
- Parish church of the Incarnation.

- Flag Coat of arms

- Location in Spain Bailén (Andalusia) Bailén (Spain)
- Coordinates: 38°5′N 3°46′W
- Country: Spain
- Autonomous community: Andalusia
- Province: Jaén
- Comarca: Sierra Morena

Government
  - Mayor: David Padilla Molina

Area
  - Total: 117.6 km^{2} (45.4 sq mi)
- Elevation: 343 m (1,125 ft)

Population (2025-01-01)
  - Total: 17,119
  - Density: 145.6/km^{2} (377.0/sq mi)
- Demonym: Bailenenses
- Time zone: UTC+1 (CET)
  - Summer (DST): UTC+2 (CEST)
- Postal code: 23710
- Website: Official website

Bailén (archaically known as Baylen in English) is a town in the province of Jaén, Spain.

== History ==
Bailén is probably the ancient Baecula, where the Romans, under Scipio the Elder, signally defeated the Carthaginians in 209 and 206 B.C. In its neighbourhood, also, in 1212, was fought the great Battle of Las Navas de Tolosa, in which, according to the ancient chroniclers, the Castilians under Alphonso VIII, slew 200,000 Almohads, and themselves only lost 25 men. Although this estimate is absurd, the victory of the Christians was complete.

There is a convent that dates from 729. The city of Bailén has a large industrial activity of ceramics, wine and hospitality, along with the cultivation of herbaceous crops and the development of an olive oil industry. The municipal area of Bailén borders the municipalities of Baños de la Encina and Guarromán to the north and west, Linares to the east, to the south with Jabalquinto and Espeluy, and with Villanueva de la Reina.

The parish church of Nuestra Señora de la Encarnación, which was built in the 15th century, in the Elizabethan Gothic style, is one of the greatest architectural exponents of the town, declared a Historical Monument. Also noteworthy are the hermitages of Nuestra Señora de la Soledad ( 15th century ), in Gothic style, the hermitages of Jesús and El Cristo, both in baroque style ( 18th century ), that of the Virgin of Zocueca, built between the 17th and 18th centuries. xviii and the parish of San José Obrero, along with its neighborhood, which celebrates its festivities in its honor on May 1.

In 1808, during the Peninsular War, it was the site of a series of clashes (the Battle of Bailén) at which General Castaños defeated General Pierre Dupont. The capitulation, signed at Andújar by Dupont on 23 July 1808, involved the surrender of 17,000 men to the Spaniards, and was the first severe blow suffered by the French in the Peninsular War.

== Climate ==
Bailén has a Mediterranean climate (Köppen climate classification: Csa) with very hot, dry summers and mild, moderately wet winters, while precipitation is moderate throughout the year. Due to its location at the eastern end of the Guadalquivir, summers tend to be very hot with particularly warm nights, while winters are colder compared to the western areas of the valley. Furthermore, precipitation is scarcer compared to western areas, as it is further away from Atlantic Ocean influences. The lowest temperature ever recorded was −3.7 °C (25.3 °F) on February 10, 2012, while the highest ever recorded was 45.2 °C (113.4 °F) on July 13, 2017. In the summer of 2025, Bailén recorded an average temperature of 30.1 °C (86.2 °F), the highest ever recorded in Spain.

Climate data for Bailén (2010-2025), extremes (2010-present)
Month	Jan	Feb	Mar	Apr	May	Jun	Jul	Aug	Sep	Oct	Nov	Dec	Year
Record high °C (°F)	25.4 (77.7)	27.9 (82.2)	31.0 (87.8)	36.2 (97.2)	40.2 (104.4)	44.2 (111.6)	45.2 (113.4)	45.1 (113.2)	42.9 (109.2)	36.6 (97.9)	27.7 (81.9)	23.2 (73.8)	45.2 (113.4)
Mean daily maximum °C (°F)	14.5 (58.1)	16.5 (61.7)	19.3 (66.7)	23.5 (74.3)	28.1 (82.6)	32.9 (91.2)	37.1 (98.8)	37.1 (98.8)	31.5 (88.7)	25.4 (77.7)	17.8 (64.0)	15.4 (59.7)	24.9 (76.9)
Daily mean °C (°F)	9.4 (48.9)	10.9 (51.6)	13.6 (56.5)	17.3 (63.1)	21.3 (70.3)	25.7 (78.3)	29.3 (84.7)	29.6 (85.3)	24.8 (76.6)	19.6 (67.3)	13.2 (55.8)	10.4 (50.7)	18.8 (65.8)
Mean daily minimum °C (°F)	4.3 (39.7)	5.3 (41.5)	7.9 (46.2)	11.1 (52.0)	14.4 (57.9)	18.5 (65.3)	21.6 (70.9)	22.0 (71.6)	18.0 (64.4)	13.8 (56.8)	8.5 (47.3)	5.3 (41.5)	12.6 (54.6)
Record low °C (°F)	−2.8 (27.0)	−3.7 (25.3)	−1.0 (30.2)	3.8 (38.8)	4.9 (40.8)	11.1 (52.0)	15.5 (59.9)	16.2 (61.2)	11.5 (52.7)	3.5 (38.3)	−1.1 (30.0)	−2.6 (27.3)	−3.7 (25.3)
Average precipitation mm (inches)	46.8 (1.84)	56.3 (2.22)	90.6 (3.57)	44.5 (1.75)	26.1 (1.03)	9.8 (0.39)	1.0 (0.04)	3.5 (0.14)	17.3 (0.68)	47.2 (1.86)	70.9 (2.79)	53.9 (2.12)	467.9 (18.43)
Source: Agencia Estatal de Meteorologia (AEMET OpenData)

== Economy ==
The town has many quarries, resulting in a reputation for craft products.

== Significant Births ==
- Felipe de Neve Founder of Los Angeles, California.
- Gregorio Manzano Football coach.

== Twin towns ==
- Móstoles, Spain
- Spétses, Greece
- Yapeyú, Argentina

== See also ==
- List of municipalities in Jaén
- María Bellido
