= Guarromán =

- city
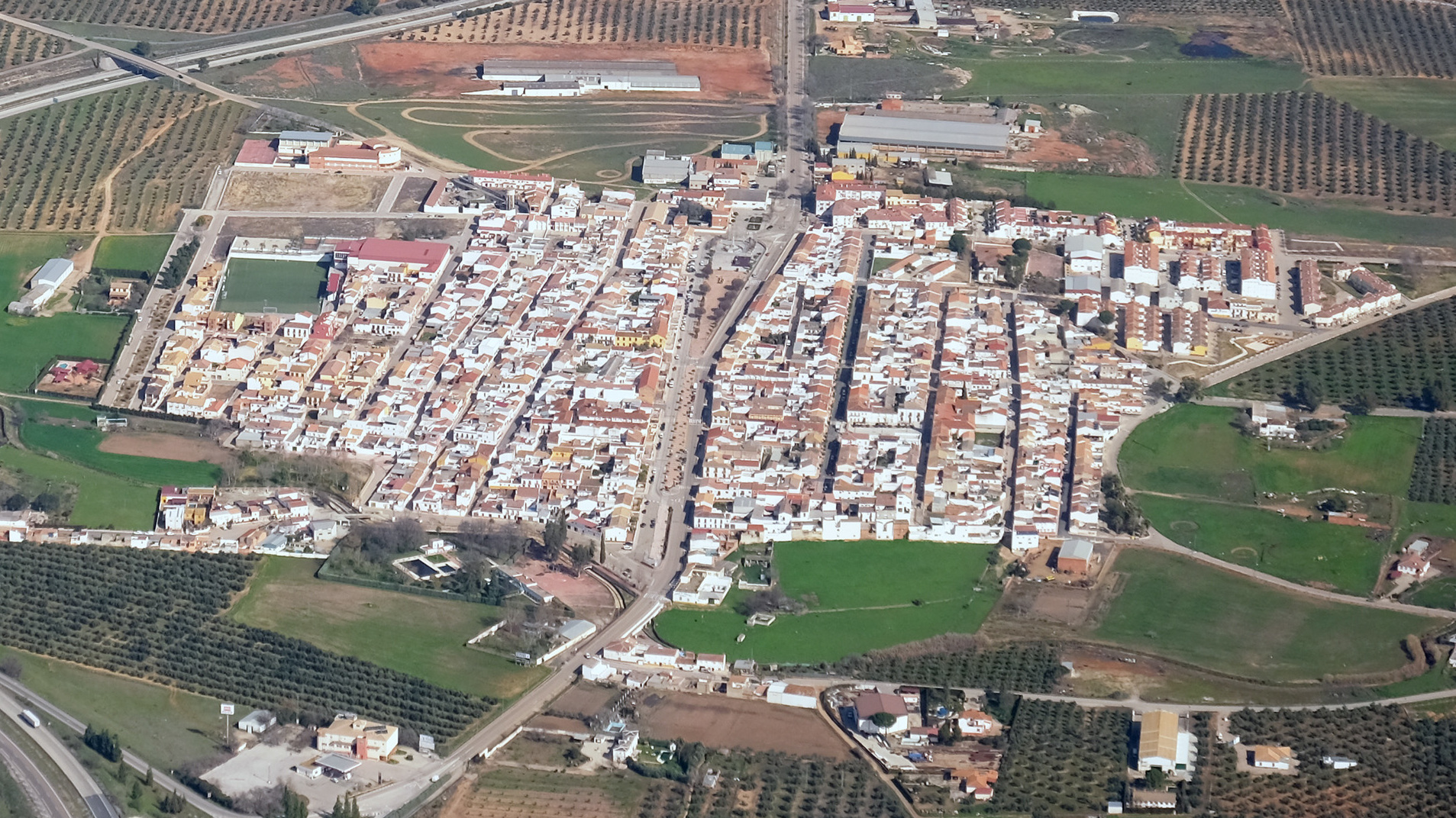

- Flag Coat of arms

- Location in the Province of Jaén Location in Andalusia Location in Spain
- Coordinates: 38°11′2.57″N 3°41′6.85″W
- Country: Spain
- Autonomous community: Andalusia
- Province: Jaén
- Comarca: Sierra Morena de Jaén

Area
  - Total: 96 km^{2} (37 sq mi)
- Elevation: 345 m (1,132 ft)

Population (2025-01-01)
  - Total: 2,703
  - Density: 28/km^{2} (73/sq mi)
- Time zone: UTC+1 (CET)
  - Summer (DST): UTC+2 (CEST)

Guarromán is a town in the province of Jaén, Spain. According to 2024 INE figures, the city had a population of 2,760.

== See also ==
- List of municipalities in Jaén
