= Battle of Ordal =

1813 battle during the Peninsular War

- Part of the Peninsular War
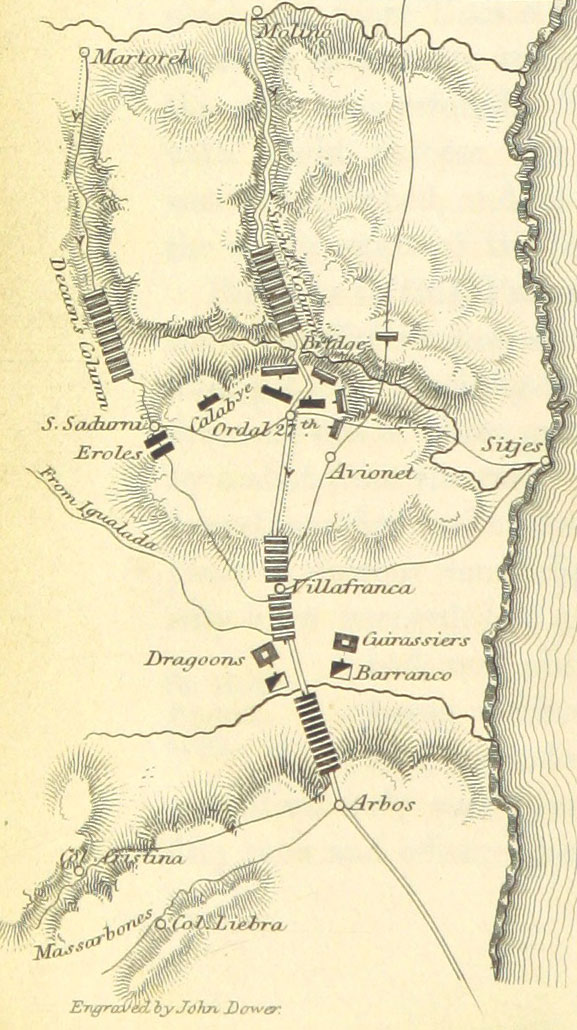
- A map of the Battle of Ordal
Date	13 September 1813
Location	near Ordal, El Lledoner, and Vilafranca; Catalonia, Spain 41.3975°N 1.8478°E
Result	French victory

Belligerents
(France) First French Empire	United Kingdom; Spain

Commanders and leaders
(France) Marshal Suchet	(United Kingdom) Lord William Bentinck (United Kingdom) Frederick Adam (WIA)

Strength
Ordal: 17,000 (Note: Up to 19,000 in total, including the columns of Suchet (12,000) and Decaen (7,000).): unknown number engaged (potentially higher than the Anglo-Spanish one) (Note: Of the 17,000 troops available (or up to 19,000; up to 12,000, excluding Decaen), it is unknown how many fought in the battle, but judging by the number of units involved, their strength exceeded that of the Coalition (see the battle map). The description of the battle also suggests that Suchet was able to concentrate his numerical superiority on the Ordal Cross.); Vilafranca: 1,750	Ordal: 20,000 (Note: Under Bentinck's disposal. 28,000 in total.): 3,800 engaged; Vilafranca: 770

Casualties and losses
Ordal: from 270–300, (Note: Casualty estimates: • 270; • 300; • Oman gives "nearly 300", but "possibly more".) incl. 12 officers, to 171 dead and 600–700 wounded: Vilafranca: 107 (Note: Casualty estimates: • 107; • Fortescue gives 271 casualties ("in the pursuit"). Oman notes "at least 100" casualties at Vilafranca.)	Ordal: from 975 dead, wounded or missing (Note: The French report on prisoners of war coincides with the number of those reported missing. Oman gives "over 1,000" casualties.) to 2,000 (mostly captured); (Note: Fortescue notes approx. 900 casualties, inclusive of dead, wounded, and captured, but, also referring to Napier, bears in mind the following remarks: "...the prisoners were at first very numerous, but the darkness enabled many to escape..."; "...Many more prisoners fell into the hands of the French at the first; and scores, if not hundreds, of stragglers must have been left behind during the retreat. But the darkness enabled most of the former to steal away; and the great majority of the exhausted men were able to rejoin the army under cover of the woods; otherwise but few of Adam’s force would have escaped...". According to Oman, the Ordal campaign resulted in 1,229 estimated casualties.) 4 guns captured: Vilafranca: 134

Peninsular War: Aragón Catalonia
current battle

The Battle of Ordal (also referred to as the Combat of the Ordal Cross) was a meeting engagement on 12 and 13 September 1813 that saw a First French Empire corps led by Marshal Louis Gabriel Suchet make a night assault on a position held by Lieutenant General Lord William Bentinck's Anglo-Allied advance guard.

The Allies, under the tactical direction of Colonel Frederick Adam, were defeated and driven from a strong position at the Ordal defile largely because he failed to post adequate pickets; Bentinck, on the other hand, underestimated the enemy's possible decisive action and its strength, and because of his blunder, the Allies put up smaller forces for defense, although overall they had more. In an action the next morning at Vilafranca del Penedès, the Allied cavalry clashed with the pursuing French horsemen and were forced to retire. These were the last victories of the "French Eagle" on Spanish soil. The actions occurred during the Peninsular War, part of the Napoleonic Wars. Ordal and El Lledoner are located on Highway N-340 between Molins de Rei and Vilafranca.

Arthur Wellesley, Marquess of Wellington's triumph at the Battle of Vitoria made Suchet's positions in Valencia and Aragon untenable. Accordingly, the marshal withdrew his soldiers from those two places and concentrated them near Barcelona. As the French withdrew, they were followed up by Bentinck's army of 28,000 Spanish, British, Germans, and Italians. Suchet resolved to strike at Adam's advance guard near Ordal with 12,000 soldiers while Charles Mathieu Isidore Decaen's 7,000 men advanced from the northeast. After Adam's defeat, Bentinck abandoned Vilafranca and fell back to Tarragona. Soon after, he resigned his command.

Suchet's victory did not salvage the French position in Catalonia. As his troops were steadily siphoned away to defend eastern France, the marshal was forced to retreat to the Pyrenees, leaving behind several garrisons. These were picked off one by one until only Barcelona remained in French hands at the end of the conflict.

== Background ==
After the Siege of Valencia ended with a Spanish capitulation on 9 January 1812, the victorious French army was temporarily halted by the illness of Marshal Louis Gabriel Suchet. The withdrawal of troops for Emperor Napoleon's planned invasion of Russia made additional conquests out of the question. Suchet, suffering from strategic overstretch, remained fairly quiet that year. On 21 July 1812, one of his division commanders, General of Division Jean Isidore Harispe drubbed General José O'Donnell's Spanish army at the First Battle of Castalla. This persuaded Thomas Maitland to abandon his amphibious invasion of Catalonia and land his small Anglo-Allied army at Spanish-controlled Alicante instead. That summer and fall, Arthur Wellesley, Marquess Wellington defeated the French at the Battle of Salamanca, captured Madrid, and was subsequently driven back to Portugal after the Siege of Burgos. During these important events Suchet and Maitland remained mostly inactive.

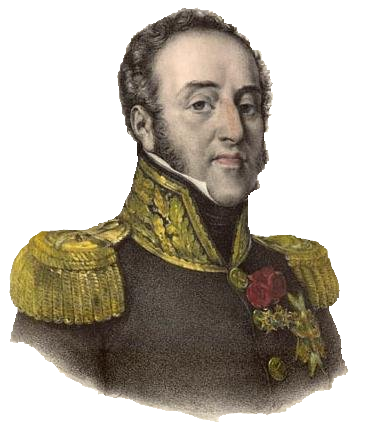
Louis Gabriel Suchet

After Maitland became ill in September, he was replaced in turn by Generals John Mackenzie, William Henry Clinton, James Campbell, and John Murray, 8th Baronet. The last-named general repulsed Suchet's attack at the Battle of Castalla on 13 April 1813, but the overcautious Murray withdrew after his victory. At the prompting of Wellington, Murray mounted a sea-borne attack in June. In the Siege of Tarragona, Murray's timidity caused him to pass up a chance to conquer the weakly defended port. Fearing relief efforts by Suchet and General of Division David-Maurice-Joseph Mathieu de La Redorte, he ordered a hasty retreat, needlessly abandoning 18 heavy siege cannons. Murray was immediately superseded by Lord Bentinck.

Wellington's decisive victory at the Battle of Vitoria on 21 June 1813 made it impossible for Suchet to hold onto the provinces of Valencia and Aragon. Severely harassed by Francisco Espoz y Mina's guerillas, General of Brigade Marie Auguste Paris abandoned Saragossa on 10 July and fled over the Pyrenees to France. Suchet evacuated the city of Valencia on 5 July and deliberately pulled back to Tarragona, leaving several French garrisons in his wake. Largely untroubled by Bentinck, the French marshal dismantled the fortifications of Tarragona and fell back toward Barcelona.

Suchet paused in his retreat at Vilafranca at the end of July. After staying there about one month, the French withdrew to the Llobregat River. Cautiously, Bentinck moved forward to occupy the abandoned territory, reaching Vilafranca on 5 September. At length, the British general linked with Francisco Copons y Navia so that he controlled 28,000 troops distributed between Tarragona, Vilafranca del Penedès, and Ordal.

== Battle ==
Holding 10,500 troops at Vilafranca, Bentinck accompanied Frederick Adam's 1,500-man Advanced Guard east to the Ordal Cross heights early on 12 September. This position, which blocked a good road, was well known for its defensive strength. The Spanish army built some field works there, which were largely demolished in 1810. Moving southeast from Sant Sadurni d'Anoia, Colonel Torres arrived at the Ordal heights with 2,300 Spanish troops from General Pedro Sarsfield's division. A cavalry patrol was sent 5 miles (8 km) east and found no Frenchmen. Before riding back to Vilafranca, Bentinck assured Adam that the position was secure. Bentinck also believed that Suchet was in full retreat and would not be able to field more than 10,000 men.

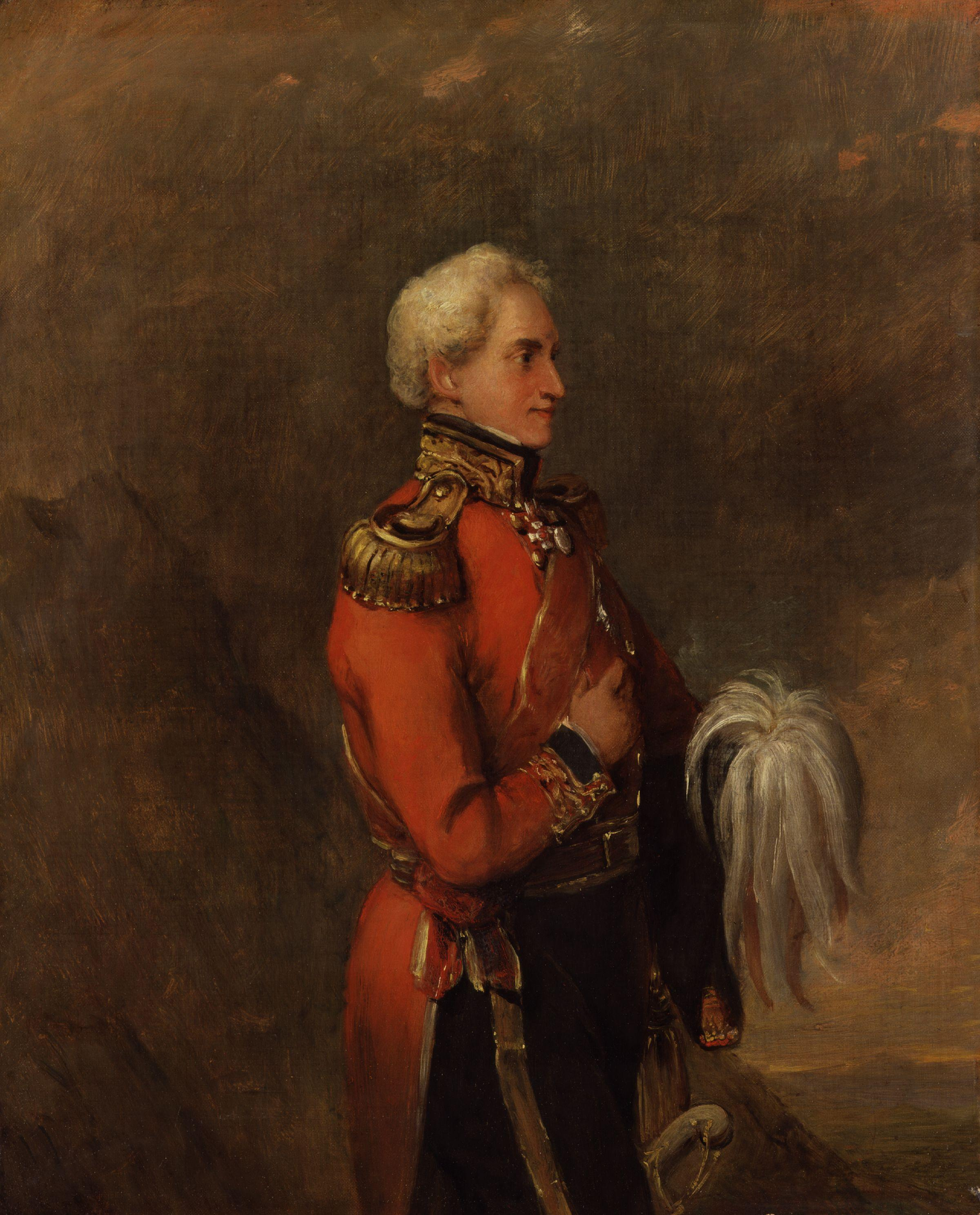
Sir Frederick Adam

Adam's unit consisted of the 2nd battalion of the 27th Foot, one rifle company each from De Roll's Swiss Regiment and the 4th Line Infantry Battalion of the King's German Legion, one battalion of the it:Calabrian Free Corps, and four pieces of artillery. Torres commanded the Badajoz, the Tiradores de Cadiz, and Volunteers of Aragon Infantry Regiments. Another source substitutes the Grenadiers of Ultonia for the Badajoz and notes that each Spanish unit had only one battalion each.

Adam posted the Calabrian Free Corps on his left flank. Four guns were placed across the highway and supported by the two rifle companies and two companies of the 27th Foot. Torres deployed his men in line to the right of the guns. At the far right, Adam placed the remaining eight companies of the 27th Foot. A group of 150 horsemen waited in the rear; these were from the Brunswick Hussar Regiment. As evening came on, Adam had his men sleep in their battle positions. He neglected his local security by not sending out patrols or picketing the Lledoner bridge, which spanned a deep ravine only 0.75 miles (1.21 km) in front of the Ordal heights.

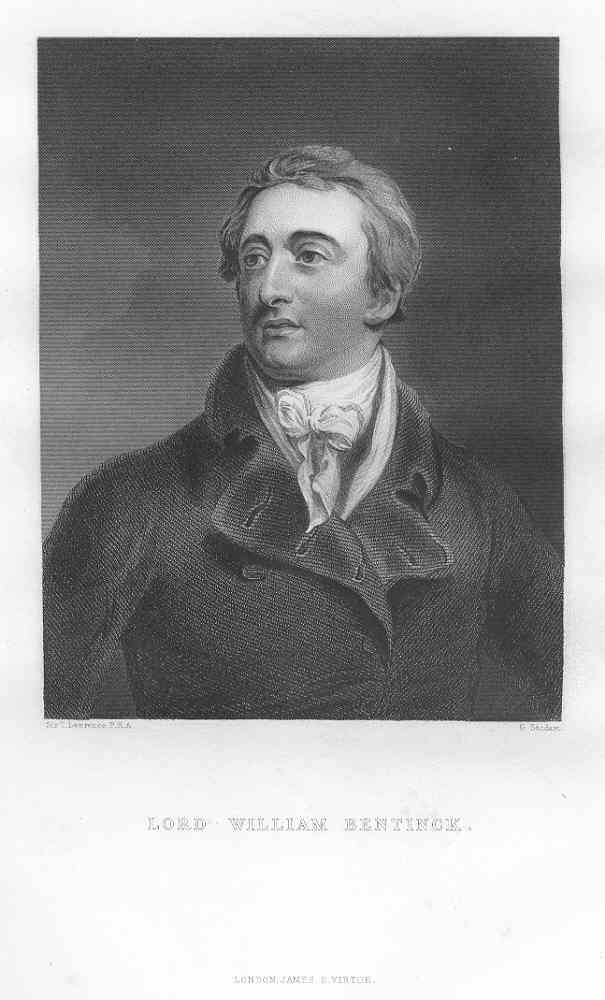
Lord William Bentinck

That evening Suchet started west from Molins de Rei with 12,000 troops in the 2nd Division of Harispe, the 3rd Division of General of Division Pierre-Joseph Habert, and cavalry. Harispe's division was made up of two battalions each of the 7th, 44th, and 116th Line Infantry Regiments. Habert's division comprised two battalions each of the 14th, 16th, and 117th Line Infantry Regiments. Suchet's 1,750-strong cavalry contingent included four squadrons each of the 4th Hussar, 13th Cuirassier, and Westphalian Chevau-léger Regiments, plus three squadrons of the 24th Dragoon Regiment. Historian Digby Smith listed General of Division André Joseph Boussart as the cavalry division commander and General of Brigade "Meyers" as his second in command, probably Friedrich Fridolin Meyer von Schauensee. However, another source states that Boussart died one month earlier. Other evidence suggests that General of Brigade Jacques-Antoine-Adrien Delort led Suchet's cavalry at this time. Gates specifies that Jacques-Antoine-Adrien Delort fought at Castalla in 1812. Mullié mistakenly puts the biography of Jacques-Antoine-Adrien Delort under Marie-Joseph-Raymond Delort. Confusingly, both were promoted to General of Brigade in 1811 and died in 1846.

A second French column under General of Division Charles Mathieu Isidore Decaen that numbered 7,000 men started from Martorell and marched southwest. Like Suchet's column, its goal was to attack Bentinck's force at Vilafranca. The sources do not give the composition of Decaen's force.

Suchet left Molins de Rei in the early evening. Marching rapidly, his troops arrived in front of the Ordal position at 11:00 PM. To his amazement, he found that the Allies failed to post any pickets. Suchet hustled his troops across the unguarded bridge and moved them uphill toward the drowsy Allies. As the French troops moved forward, telltale noises aroused the interest of a Spanish cavalry patrol, which trotted forward to see what was happening. These horsemen were greeted by a blast of musketry, which awakened Adam's men. At the front of Harispe's division, General of Brigade Jean Mesclop led the 7th Line to the attack. Halfway up the hill, the 7th Line bumped into an entrenchment held by four Spanish infantry companies. The defenders fell back to a second field work higher up the hillside. After being joined by more Spaniards, these soldiers mounted a counterattack, which briefly pushed back the 7th Line.

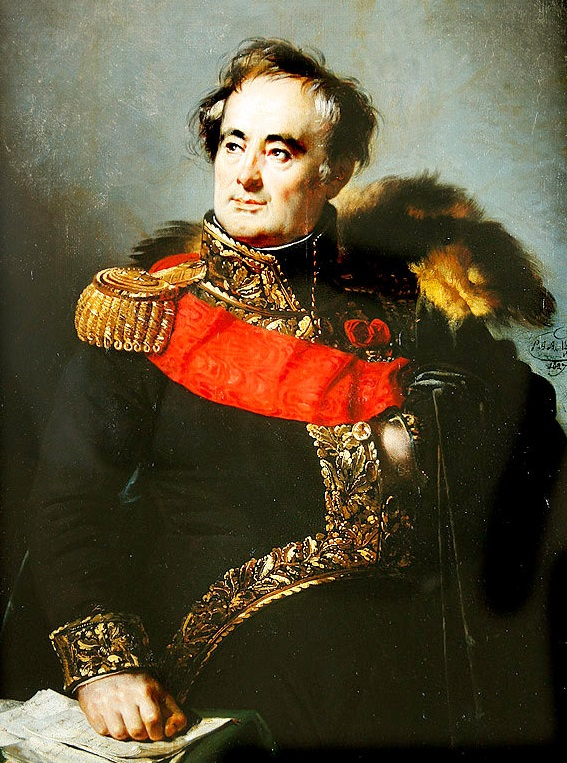
Charles Decaen

Joined by the 44th Line, the 7th Line attacked again and rolled over the Spanish redoubt, killing many of its defenders. Suchet fed troops into the fight, sending Habert's division to the left and placing Harispe's second brigade in support of Mesclop. As the French attack developed, it spread farther and farther to the left to put pressure on the Allied right flank. Thomas Robert Bugeaud, then only a captain in the 116th Line, led his troops across the ravine on a narrow path just to the south of the bridge. This battalion arrived in front of the main body of the 27th Foot. Early in the action, Adam was wounded and handed over command to Colonel Reeves who was later wounded as well. Meanwhile, the Spanish fought well under their commanders, including Colonel Antony Bray of the Tiradores de Cadiz and the Grenadiers under Rafael Larruda. However, the weight of the French attack finally flanked and broke the Anglo-Spanish right. As the allied soldiers fled, Suchet launched Delort in pursuit with the 4th Hussars. The Brunswick Hussars momentarily checked the pursuit, but the 4th Hussars managed to overrun and capture all four British guns which had been withdrawn before the end of the fight. Altogether the 4th Hussars rounded up nearly 500 prisoners.

After losing very few men in the action, the Calabrians under Colonel Carey retreated to the northwest. During the night, they ran into the head of Decaen's column and had to quickly reverse course to the south. After passing behind Suchet's advancing column, Carey's men reached the coast where they were taken off by Allied shipping, having lost 51 men. Torres' troops and about 150 men of the 27th Foot made off in the direction of Sant Sadurni and, from there, reached Vilafranca without incident.

== Result ==
Trooper and Trumpeter of the Sicilian Light Cavalry

Spanish casualties numbered 87 killed, 239 wounded, and 132 missing. Adam's brigade suffered 75 killed, 109 wounded, and 333 missing. Altogether, the Allies lost 975 men at Ordal. Another claim is 2,000 Allied casualties, mostly captured. French losses are estimated at 300. Another authority states that the French lost 270 men and that the 27th Foot alone suffered 360 casualties. A third source reported far heavier French losses, 171 killed and 600 to 700 wounded.

After hearing the news of Ordal and finding that Decaen was bearing down on him from the northeast, Bentinck evacuated Vilafranca. On the opposite side of town, he personally deployed his cavalry as a rear guard. His 770 troopers included two squadrons each of the 20th Light Dragoons, Brunswick Hussars, and Sicilian Cavalry Regiments, plus one troop of the Foreign Hussar Regiment. Anglo-Allied losses were 25 killed, 69 wounded, and 40 missing for a total of 134. French casualties numbered 7 officers and 100 men out of 1,750 sabers in four regiments. With this action, Suchet's pursuit ended.

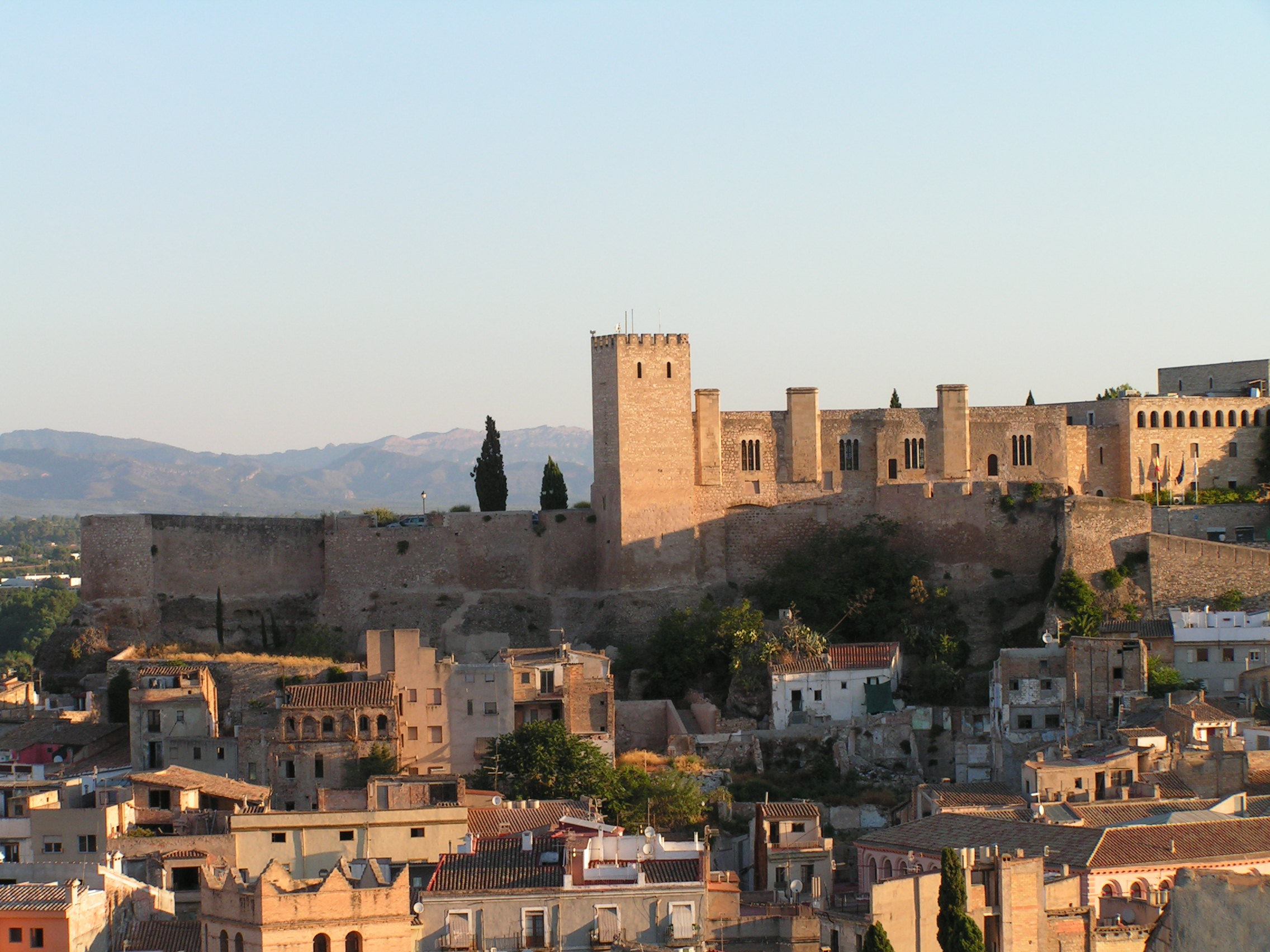
Tortosa's fortifications

After the battle, Bentinck admitted his defeat in a dispatch to Wellington. He praised the bravery of his British and Spanish soldiers. Then he turned over command to Lieutenant General William Henry Clinton and sailed back to Sicily. After the war, Torres and Bray were decorated for bravery in action.

By late 1813, Suchet's forces in Catalonia numbered 46,000 men. His field force included General of Division Louis François Félix Musnier's 3,561-man 1st Division, General of Brigade Claude Marie Joseph de Valdotte Pannetier's 3,073-strong 2nd Division, Mathieu's 2,373-man 3rd Division, Habert's 3,975-strong 4th Division, General of Division Jean Maximilien Lamarque's 4,205-man 5th Division, 2,501 cavalry, and 3,000 gunners and others. The French had 9,493 troops in garrisons at Tortosa, Lleida, and Sagunto, 1,605 at Gerona, 1,742 at Figueras, 5,844 at Barcelona, and 4,918 at smaller fortresses.

The new commander, Clinton declined to tangle with the wily Suchet. With no action forthcoming, the Anglo-Allied army in eastern Spain was broken up and sent to reinforce Sicily or Wellington's army. Meanwhile, Suchet was forced to disband his German units as their states abandoned the French alliance. After Napoleon ordered many of his troops away to defend eastern France, Suchet had only 17,000 men left in his field army. He evacuated most of Catalonia except for Barcelona and Figueras. By forging Suchet's signature, a rogue staff officer named Juan Van Halen was able to secure the surrender of 1,900 troops and the fortresses of Lleida, Mequinenza, and Monzón. Only General of Brigade Louis Benoît Robert at Tortosa was not fooled by the trick.

Eventually, Suchet was compelled to fall back to the Pyrenees. By April 1814, his army counted only 16,110 troops. Of these, Lamarque's division had 8,491 men in 11 battalions, Mesclop's brigade numbered 3,990 soldiers in seven battalions, the cavalry included 1,449 troopers in seven squadrons, and the artillery had 2,180 artillerists and others to man 24 guns. By the end, the fortified places had all fallen to the Anglo-Spanish except at Barcelona where Habert maintained a fanatical resistance. Weeks after Napoleon abdicated, Habert was finally persuaded to surrender and the last vestige of French occupation finally flickered out.
