= André Joseph Boussart =

French military

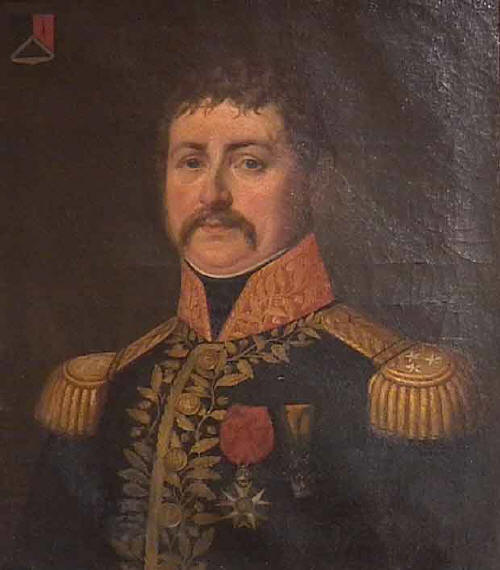
- André Joseph Boussart
- Nickname: « Le Brave Wallon »
- Born: 13 November 1758; Binche, Belgium
- Died: 11 August 1813 (aged 54) Bagnères de Bigorre, France
- Allegiance: (Habsburg monarchy) Habsburg Austria; France
- Branch: Cavalry
- Rank: General of Division
- Conflicts: French Revolutionary Wars; Napoleonic Wars
- Awards: Légion d'Honneur
- Other work: Baron of the Empire, 1808

André Joseph Boussart or André Joseph Boussard (French pronunciation: [ɑ̃dʁe ʒozef busaʁ]; 13 November 1758 – 11 August 1813) was a French soldier and general. He enlisted in the army of Habsburg Austria as a youth. A native of the Austrian Netherlands, he joined the Brabant Revolution against Austria and fled to France when the rebellion collapsed. He soon found himself fighting for France during the French Revolutionary Wars. Promoted to general officer during the French Campaign in Egypt and Syria, he returned to France where he held several non-combat posts.

He commanded a dragoon brigade during the 1805 and 1806–1807 campaigns. At Prenzlau he led a highly successful charge against forces of the Kingdom of Prussia, capturing many soldiers and cannon. After the battle his cavalry participated in the mopping up operations in Prussia. He was wounded fighting the Russians at Czarnowo and Pultusk. He transferred to Spain in 1808 where he was captured in the Bailén debacle. He was exchanged and fought in many battles at the head of Marshal Louis Gabriel Suchet's cavalry during the Peninsular War. Recklessly brave, he suffered many wounds during his military career and was nearly killed at Valencia. He died of his injuries in the summer of 1813.

== Early career ==
A native of the Austrian Netherlands, Boussart was born on 13 November 1758 in Binche in what is now Belgium. As a young man, he joined the Austrian army and by 1789 he was a junior leutnant in the cavalry. In that year, he quit the Austrian army and transferred his loyalty to the United States of Belgium at the time of the Brabant Revolution. He served in the insurgent army as a captain and later escaped to France when the Austrians put down the Belgian revolt. In his new country he enlisted in the Hainault Dragoon Regiment and was promoted to lieutenant on 28 July 1792. He became captain on 1 October. He was involved in an action against an Austrian column on 1 March 1793.

Transferred to the Army of Italy as a chef d'escadron (major) of the 20th Dragoon Regiment, Boussart fought at the Battle of Mondovì on 21 April 1796. In this action he was wounded three times by saber cuts while fighting Piedmontese cavalrymen. At the Battle of Lodi he crossed the Adda with the cavalry. At the Battle of Castiglione on 5 August, he and a party of cavalry captured a group of Austrian hussars. On 7 January 1797 he was promoted to chef de brigade (colonel).

Boussart went with Napoleon Bonaparte to Egypt and fought at the Battle of the Pyramids on 21 July 1798 and the Battle of Abukir on 25 July 1799. He was named general of brigade on 23 September 1800, which was confirmed when he got back to France. In the Battle of Alexandria on 21 March 1801, he fought against the British. Wounded three times in the action, he required several months of convalescence. At the end of the Siege of Alexandria on 2 September 1801, he was ordered to sign the articles of capitulation. He became a member of the legion d'honneur on 11 December 1803 and served in the Bordeaux military district as a dragoon commander.

== 1805–1807 ==
In the War of the Third Coalition against Austria, Boussart led a brigade in Frédéric Henri Walther's 2nd Dragoon Division. He fought at the Battle of Austerlitz on 2 December 1805.

During the War of the Fourth Coalition against Prussia, Boussart led the 3rd Brigade in Emmanuel Grouchy's 2nd Dragoon Division. The 13th and 22nd Dragoon Regiments, each three squadrons strong, were placed under his command. Grouchy's division missed the Battle of Jena-Auerstedt but became deeply involved in the pursuit of the defeated Prussian armies. At Zehdenick on 26 October, Grouchy's division crushed a 1,300-man Prussian brigade, decimating the Königin Dragoon Regiment Nr. 5. The next day, the Gensdarmes Cuirassier Regiment Nr. 10 blundered into Grouchy's marching column at Wichmannsdorf near Boitzenburg. Three of Grouchy's regiments attacked the Prussians, trapping them against a marsh and forcing their surrender.

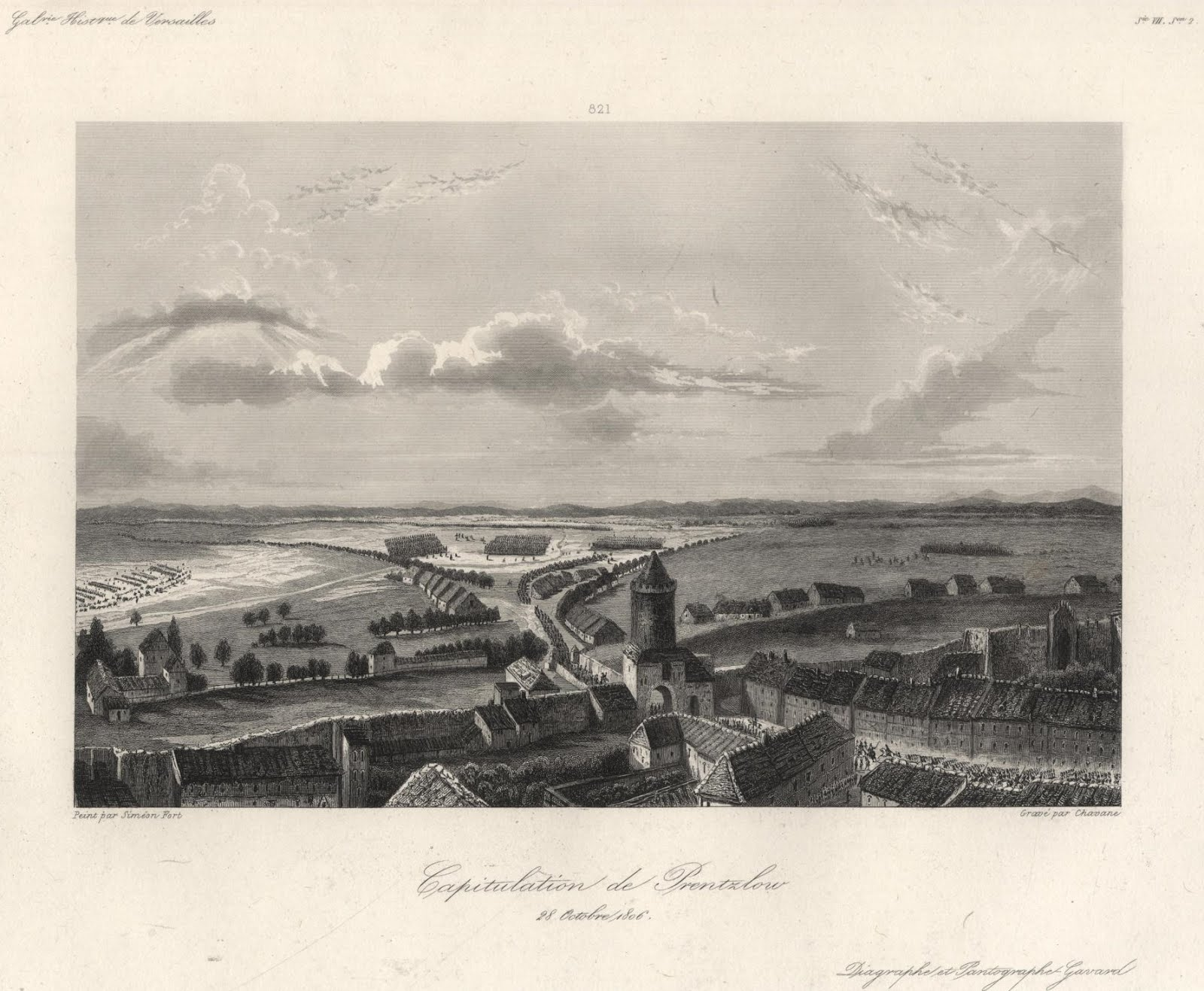
Capitulation of Prenzlau by Simon Fort

Boussart played a key role in the Battle of Prenzlau on 28 October. Marshal Joachim Murat led Grouchy's division, Marc Antoine de Beaumont's 3rd Dragoon Division, Antoine Lasalle's light cavalry brigade, and 3,000 of Marshal Jean Lannes' infantry against Frederick Louis, Prince of Hohenlohe-Ingelfingen's 12,000 Prussians. The Prussians approached Prenzlau from the northwest while the French came up from the southwest. Murat sent Lasalle's brigade directly against Hohenlohe's covering force while ordering one of Beaumont's brigades to make a wide circuit to the west. Meanwhile, he detached Boussart's brigade and sent it to ford a stream on the western outskirts of the town. Boussart's horsemen charged the Prussian marching column, smashing into it from the side. The attack was a complete success. The French dragoons hacked their way through the column and seized many prisoners. Boussart's troopers cleared the road as far as the city gates, inflicted about 1,000 casualties and captured eight guns. Meanwhile, Beaumont's division surrounded and captured the now-isolated Prussian rear guard. Shortly afterward, Murat bluffed a dazed Hohenlohe into surrendering with 10,000 men.

On 2 and 3 November, the 22nd Dragoons of Boussart's brigade secured the surrender of the small port of Wolgast on the Baltic Sea. Hohenlohe's baggage train of 500 wagons with 2,500 teamsters and other non-combatants fell into the hands of the French. Grouchy's division arrived in time to take part in the Battle of Lübeck on 6 November. After the French infantry cleared the city streets, the dragoons moved through the city to fall upon a Prussian detachment at Krempelsdorf. They forced Major Ende to surrender with 360 cavalrymen and four guns.

Boussart was wounded on 23 December at the Battle of Czarnowo. Three days later, he was seriously wounded at the Battle of Pultusk while serving under the command of Nicolas Léonard Beker. The dragoons of Beker fought on Lannes' left flank.

Boussart fought at the Battle of Eylau on 7 and 8 February 1807. Grouchy's 2,200-strong division joined in Murat's grand charge at a critical moment during the bloody contest. The dragoons first drove off the Russian cavalry menacing Louis Vincent Le Blond de Saint-Hilaire's infantry division. Then Murat led them in an attack that defeated the Russian cavalry in the center. By this time the 2nd Cuirassier Division had become isolated after carving a path through two lines of Russian infantry. Marshal Jean-Baptiste Bessières now led the Guard cavalry to the rescue. After being rebuffed by the Russian second line, Grouchy's troopers joined the Horse Grenadiers of the Imperial Guard and smashed their way through. Finally, the French reserve cavalry had to cut its way out from behind the Russian lines, losing between 1,000 and 1,500 troopers altogether.

== Spain ==
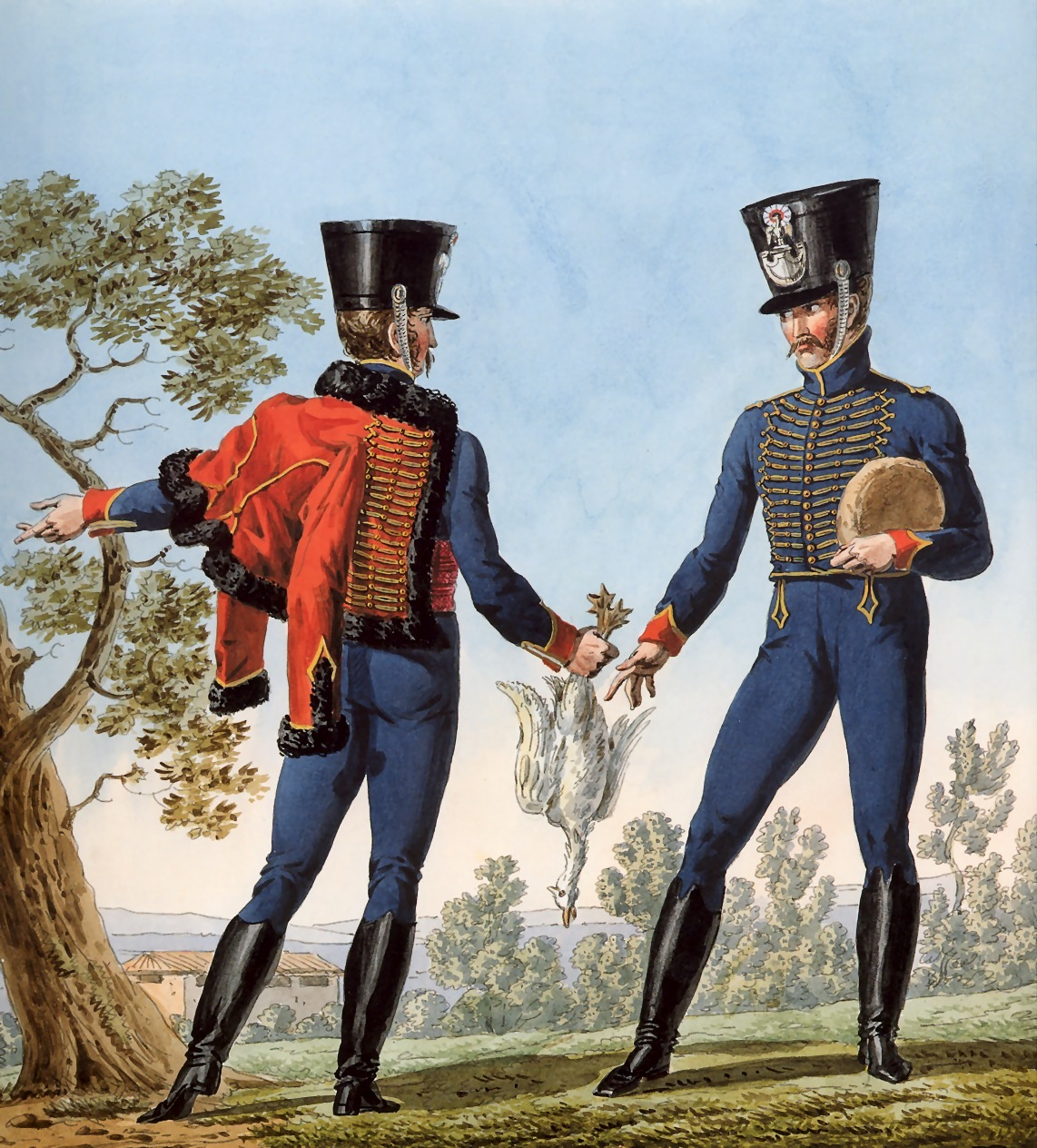
Boussart's 4th Hussar Regiment

Napoleon appointed Boussart a Baron of the Empire on 19 March 1808 and posted the much-wounded veteran to Spain. In 1808 he was with Pierre Dupont de l'Étang's corps in Andalusia. He led a cavalry brigade that consisted of the 6th Provisional Dragoon Regiment and numbering 620 troopers. On 17 July his command was detached with Dominique Honoré Antoine Vedel's division to march to Bailén. However, Vedel marched beyond the town in a mistaken belief that the Spanish had seized the passes to the north. In fact, Theodor von Reding's 17,000-man Spanish corps arrived at Bailén on the 18th and occupied the town without opposition. This placed Dupont's 11,000 men squarely between Reding and Francisco Javier Castaños's corps. In the Battle of Bailén, Dupont failed to break out of trap and asked for terms. While the negotiations were going on, Vedel's division returned. Boussart's dragoons attacked and captured about 1,000 Spanish troops. When a Spanish delegation warned Vedel that there was a truce in force, he ordered his soldiers to cease fire. When Dupont ordered him to release the prisoners taken during the parley, Vedel did so. As Dupont surrendered, Vedel began retreating north in accordance with secret orders from his superior. Later, when the Spaniards threatened to massacre Dupont's men unless Vedel was included in the capitulation, Dupont sent an order to Vedel to return to Bailén and surrender. Amazingly, Vedel followed the order even though his division was not surrounded. This more than doubled the total of unwounded prisoners taken from 8,242 to 17,635. While Dupont and the French generals were returned to France, the enlisted men spent the rest of the war in prison hulks or on the bleak island of Cabrera and half of them died of disease or starvation.

In January 1810, Boussart next appeared in the French order of battle in Spain at the head of Suchet's 1,899-strong III Corps cavalry. On 23 April at Margalef in Catalonia, Suchet encountered 7,300 Spaniards and six artillery pieces under Henry O'Donnell. The 6,000 Frenchmen included Louis François Félix Musnier's division and the 13th Cuirassier and 4th Hussar Regiments. In the event, the 500 cuirassiers won the battle almost single-handed. The French horsemen suffered 100 casualties but rode down O'Donnell's hapless troops. The Spanish lost 500 killed and wounded, plus 2,000 soldiers and four colors captured. The successful Siege of Lerida quickly followed. Between 29 April and 13 May, Suchet forced García Conde to capitulate with six generals, 307 officers, 7,000 soldiers, and 105 cannon. During the siege operations, the Spanish lost 1,700 killed and wounded while the French lost 1,000 out of the 13,000 men in III Corps.

On 16 December 1810, Suchet's 12,000-man Army of Aragon invested Tortosa. By 2 January 1811, the Siege of Tortosa was concluded after the French inflicted 1,400 casualties on the defenders, while suffering only 400 killed and wounded. The French forced the 3,974 survivors of Conde de Alacha Lilli's garrison to surrender. Boussart's cavalry, the 13th Cuirassier, 4th Hussar, and 24th Dragoon Regiments, were present during the operation. Boussart participated in the Siege of Tarragona from 5 May to 29 June 1811. He led his three French regiments plus the Italian Napoleone Dragoon Regiment. The French besiegers lost 4,300 killed and wounded, while the Spanish defenders lost 7,000 killed and 8,000 captured. Twice during the operation, Suchet formed expeditions to chase off armies attempting to relieve the garrison.

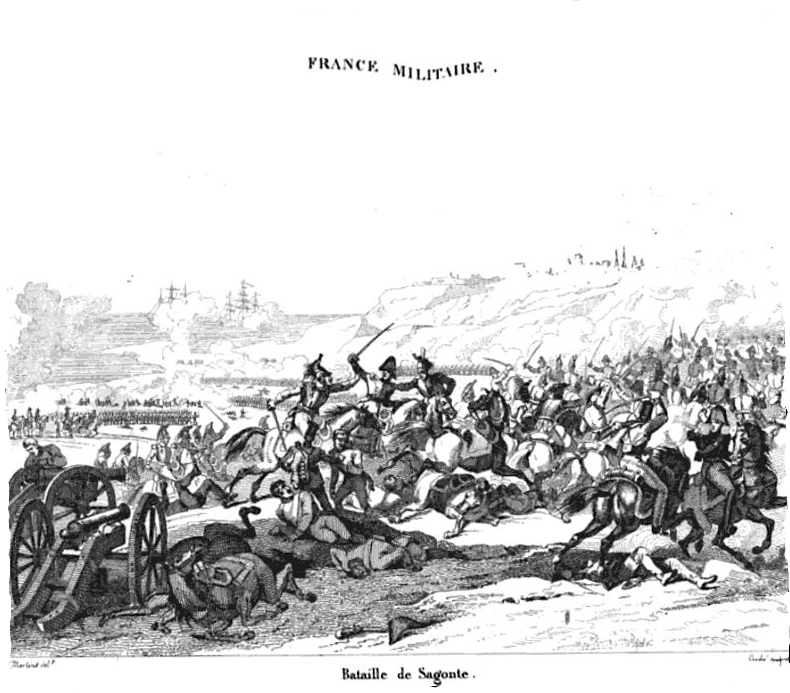
Battle of Saguntum, 25 October 1811

On 15 July 1811, Boussart commanded 1,876 cavalrymen in three regiments. In September, his command numbered 2,405 in 14 squadrons. In late summer, Suchet launched an invasion of the province of Valencia, arriving before the ancient fortress of Saguntum (Sagunto) on 23 September 1811. After the garrison repelled two French assaults, a relief army of Joaquín Blake y Joyes appeared and the two sides clashed in the Battle of Saguntum on 25 October. While the French dispersed Blake's left flank rather easily, the fighting in the center and right of the Spanish line was much tougher. Early in the action, Suchet committed three squadrons of cavalry to retake some ground. Soon afterward, the Spanish cavalry overran a French battery and Suchet sent in 350 troopers of the 13th Cuirassiers. Leading the charge, Boussart scattered the Spanish horsemen and recaptured the guns. Hewing a path through their opponents, the armor-clad heavy cavalrymen captured a Spanish artillery battery before their impetus was spent. When Suchet ordered the 24th Dragoons to attack, the rout of Blake's army became general. For a loss of 1,000 casualties, the French inflicted 6,000 killed and wounded on the Spanish, not counting several hundred prisoners. The 2,500-man Saguntum garrison, disheartened by the spectacle, capitulated the next day.

In the operations immediately preceding the Siege of Valencia, Suchet concentrated most of his army in an envelopment of the landward flank of Blake's defenses. Fooled by diversionary attacks, Blake failed to detect Suchet's maneuver until too late. Led by one squadron of the 4th Hussars, Jean Isidore Harispe's division reached a position behind the Spanish left flank. Coming upon the Spanish cavalry reserves near Aldaia and Torrent, Boussart recklessly led 60 hussars to attack the vastly more numerous Spanish horsemen. Soon, he was covered in saber wounds and his bravest men were cut down around him. Luckily, Jacques-Antoine-Adrien Delort came to the rescue with more cavalry. After Harispe and the French cavalry routed the Spanish troopers, they found Boussart lying among the fallen after having been robbed of his medals and sword.

Boussart received promotion to general of division on 16 March 1812. In the middle of fall 1812, his cavalry division counted 1,922 horsemen. At the Battle of Castalla on 13 April 1813, he led 1,424 troopers in eight squadrons. In a preliminary action at Biar on 12 April, Frederick Adam fought an effective rear guard action at Biar, ambushing the 13th Cuirassiers and keeping the French troops in check. The next day, Suchet sent Boussart to turn John Murray, 8th Baronet's right flank. However, the flank was protected by waterlogged ground, so the cavalry general could only observe his enemies as Suchet's main attack was defeated. The French commander soon recalled Boussart and retreated.

Boussart retired to Bagnères de Bigorre in order to recuperate from his battle injuries. He died there of his many wounds on 11 August 1813.
