= Siege of Valencia (1812) =

1812 siege during the Peninsular War

- Part of Peninsular War
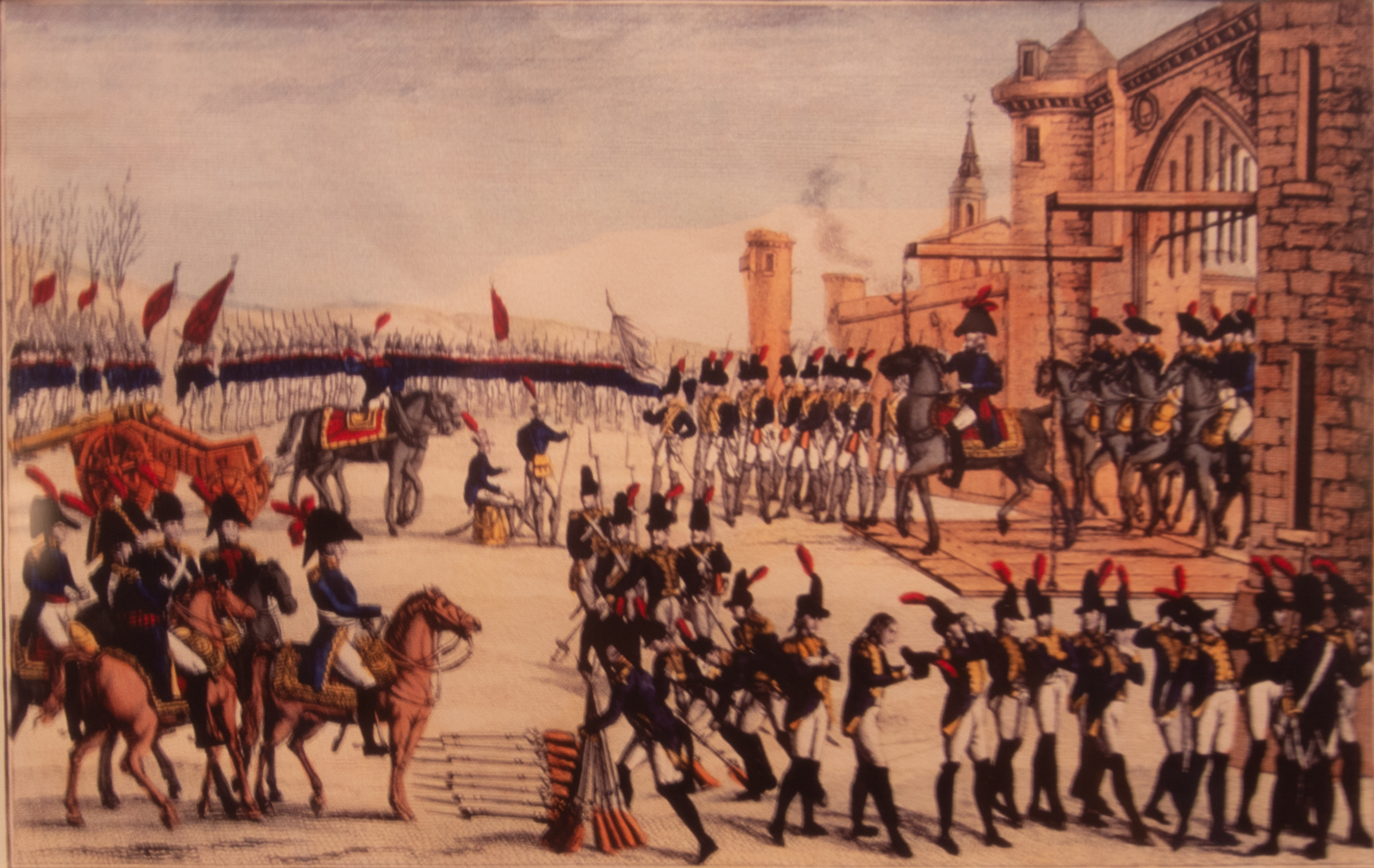
- Entry of Marshal Suchet in Valencia through the San José Gate on 14 January 1812
Date	26 December 1811 – 9 January 1812
Location	Valencia, Spain 39.4703°N 0.3767°W
Result	French victory

Belligerents
France	Spain

Commanders and leaders
(France) Marshal Suchet	(Spain) Joaquín Blake

Strength
20,595–33,000	28,044–33,000

Casualties and losses
2,000	20,281–21,400; 374–455 guns

Peninsular War: Aragón Catalonia
current battle

The siege of Valencia from 3 November 1811 to 9 January 1812, saw Marshal Louis Gabriel Suchet's French Army of Aragon besiege Captain General Joaquín Blake y Joyes's forces in the city of Valencia, Spain, during the Peninsular War. The 20,000 to 30,000 French troops compelled 16,000 Spanish soldiers to surrender at the conclusion of the siege, although another 7,000 Spaniards escaped from the trap. Suchet quickly converted Valencia into an important base of operations after this Napoleonic Wars action. Valencia, modern-day capital of the Valencian Community, is located on the east coast of Spain.

== Background ==
On July 8, 1811, Marshal Suchet received his baton, making him the only French general to be appointed Marshal of France for winning victories in Spain. He won this honor specifically for his victory in the siege of Tarragona. The port of Tarragona fell to the French on 29 June 1811 as a British naval squadron stood helplessly offshore. Suchet pressed the siege ruthlessly and lost 4,300 troops during the operation, but Spanish losses were far heavier. The loss of the port involved most of the Army of Catalonia and therefore left Spanish forces in the area gravely weakened.

Emperor Napoleon I of France ordered his newly minted marshal to capture Valencia. During the summer and fall of 1811, Suchet seized Montserrat, triumphed over Captain General Blake at Benaguasil, and captured the port of Oropesa del Mar. On 15 September, 25,000 French invaded Valencia and once again defeated Blake at the Battle of Saguntum on 26 October, where Suchet sustained a severe wound in his shoulder. Reinforced by two additional divisions, the French relentlessly advanced.

== Siege ==
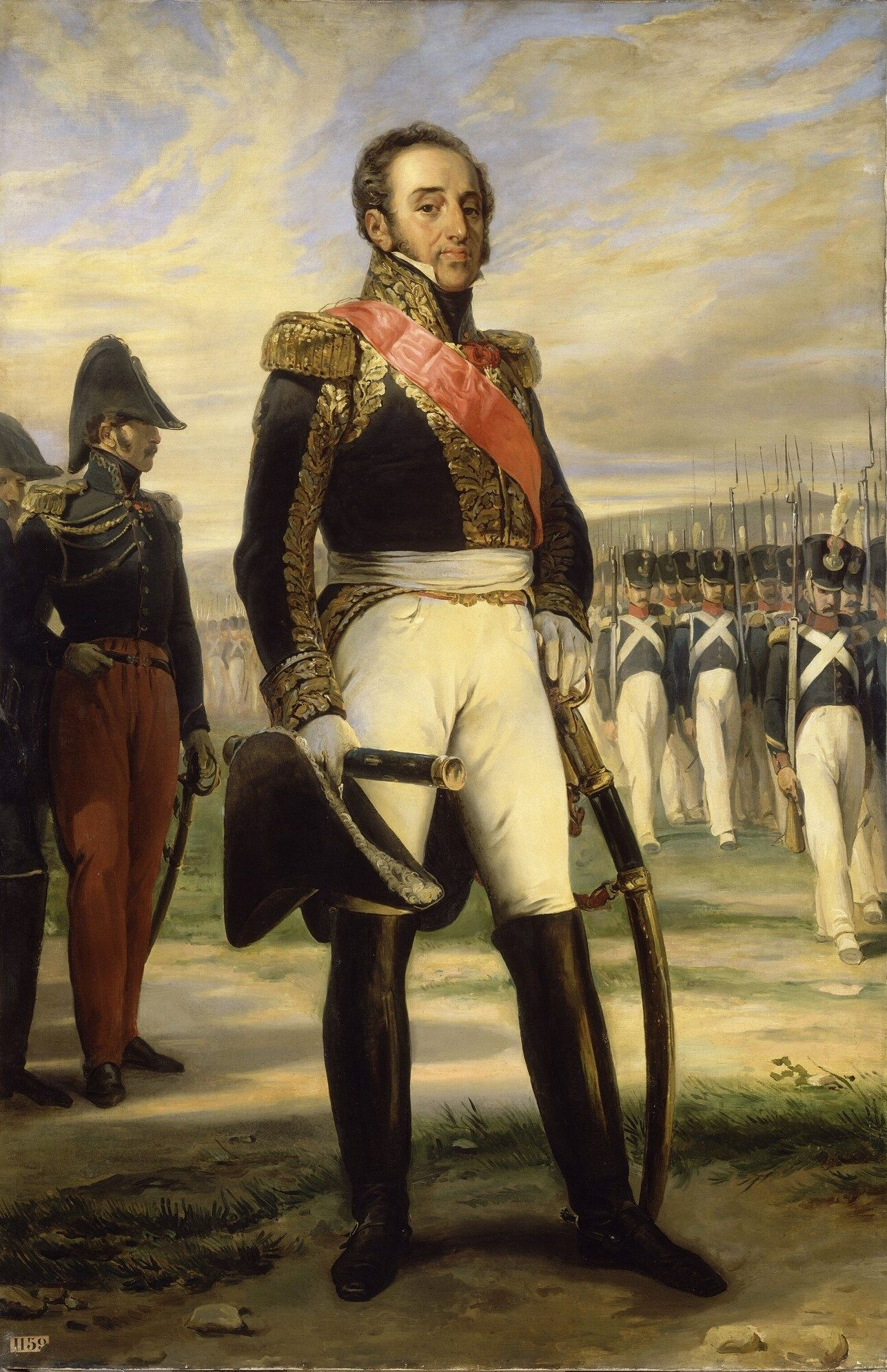
Portrait of Louis-Gabriel Suchet in uniform.

Suchet commanded 20,595 men in five infantry divisions under Generals of Division Louis François Félix Musnier, Jean Isidore Harispe, Pierre-Joseph Habert, Giuseppe Frederico Palombini, and Claude Antoine Compère, plus cavalry and artillerists. Musnier's 1st Division consisted of the 114th and 121st Line Infantry Regiments, three battalions each, and the 1st and 2nd Infantry Regiments of the Legion of the Vistula, two battalions each. Harispe's 2nd Division included the following infantry regiments, 7th Line, four battalions, 44th Line and 3rd Vistula Legion, two battalions each, and 116th Line, three battalions. Habert's 3rd Division comprised the 16th and 117th Line Infantry Regiments, three battalions each, and the 15th Line Infantry Regiment, two battalions.

Palombini's Kingdom of Italy Division had the 2nd Light and 4th and 6th Line Infantry Regiments, three battalions each, and the 5th Line Infantry Regiment, two battalions. Compère's weak Kingdom of Naples Division consisted of the 1st Light and the 1st and 2nd Line Infantry Regiments, one battalion each. General of Brigade André Joseph Boussart led Suchet's cavalry, including the 13th Cuirassier, 4th Hussar, and Italian Napoleone Dragoon Regiments, four squadrons each, 24th Dragoon Regiment, two squadrons, and Neapolitan Chasseurs à Cheval, one squadron. One authority asserted that Suchet had 30,000 men and added General of Division Honoré Charles Reille's infantry division to the French order of battle. Another source gave Suchet 33,000 soldiers and the divisions of both Reille and General of Division Filippo Severoli.

Blake disposed of 28,044 soldiers for the defense of Valencia, organized in three groups, the Expeditionary Corps, the 2nd Valencian Army, and the 3rd Murcian Army. The Expeditionary Corps' included the infantry divisions of Generals Miguel Lardizabal y Uribe and José Pascual de Zayas y Chacón plus General Casimiro Loy's cavalry and two horse artillery batteries, a total of 6,041 men. The 2nd Army consisted of the infantry divisions of Generals Miranda, José Obispo, Villacampa, and Velasco, plus General San Juan's cavalry. The 2nd Army mustered 16,468 men, two foot and one horse artillery batteries. Counting 5,535 troops, the 3rd Army had the brigades of Generals Creagh and Montijo plus eight squadrons of cavalry and one horse artillery battery.

Map of the siege of Valencia, showing positions on 26 December 1811.

Blake deployed his army facing generally north with his right wing on the coast, his right-center in Valencia, his left-center at Mislata, and his left at Manises. The divisions of Obispo and Villacampa, which had performed poorly at the Battle of Sagunto, held the left flank. To their right stood Creagh's brigade. Next in line were the good-quality divisions of Lardizabal and Zayas. Miranda's division occupied Valencia while some irregulars held the gap between the city and the coast. Blake posted his cavalry at Aldaia and Torrent, behind his left flank. Though the line as far as Manises was fortified and protected by canals and ditches, the left flank hung in the air.

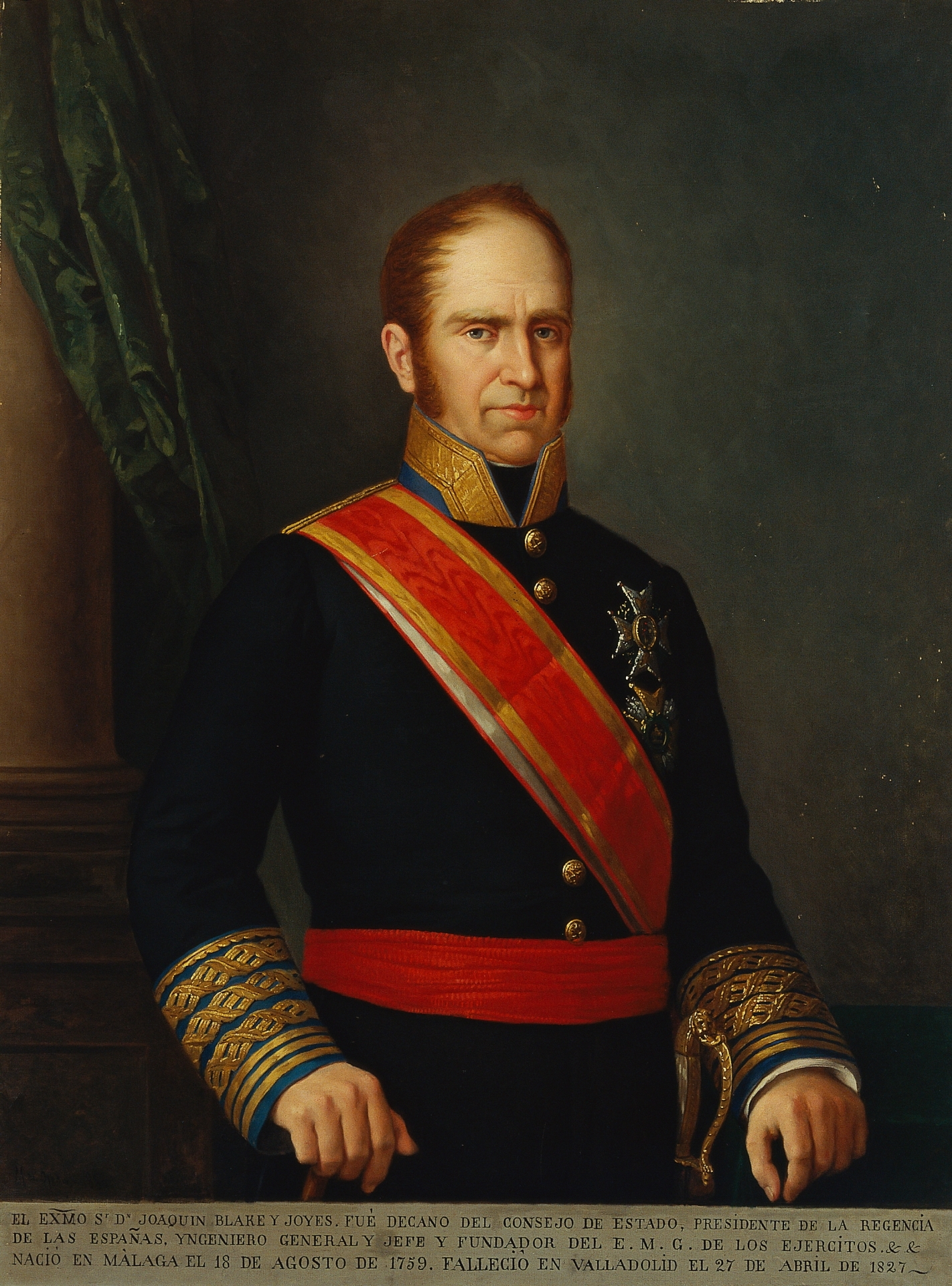
Black and white portrait of Joaquín Blake y Joyes.

Suchet discerned that Blake's left flank was the weak point and determined to envelop it. He planned to take the divisions of Harispe, Musnier, Reille, and Boussart in a wide sweep around the open Spanish flank. Suchet directed Habert to break through along the coast, while Palombini attacked Mislata and Compère observed the Spanish lines. If all went well, Suchet might bag Blake's entire army. On the night of 25 December, Suchet led his main column across the river Túria at Riba-roja de Túria.

At first, Habert's attack on his right flank fooled Blake into thinking it was Suchet's main effort. Then Palombini's attack at Mislata diverted his attention. Despite persistent assaults, the Italians failed to break through and suffered heavy losses. Suchet's main column reached Blake's left rear virtually unopposed. As Harispe approached the village of Aldaia, he sighted the Spanish cavalry reserve. With a single squadron of the 4th Hussars, Boussart rashly attacked a vastly superior force. The handful of French horsemen were wiped out, while Boussart was cut down and left for dead, his sword and decorations pilfered. The bulk of the French cavalry under General of Brigade Jacques-Antoine-Adrien Delort soon came up and routed the Spanish troopers, driving them beyond the Rio Júcar and depriving Blake of much-needed cavalry support.

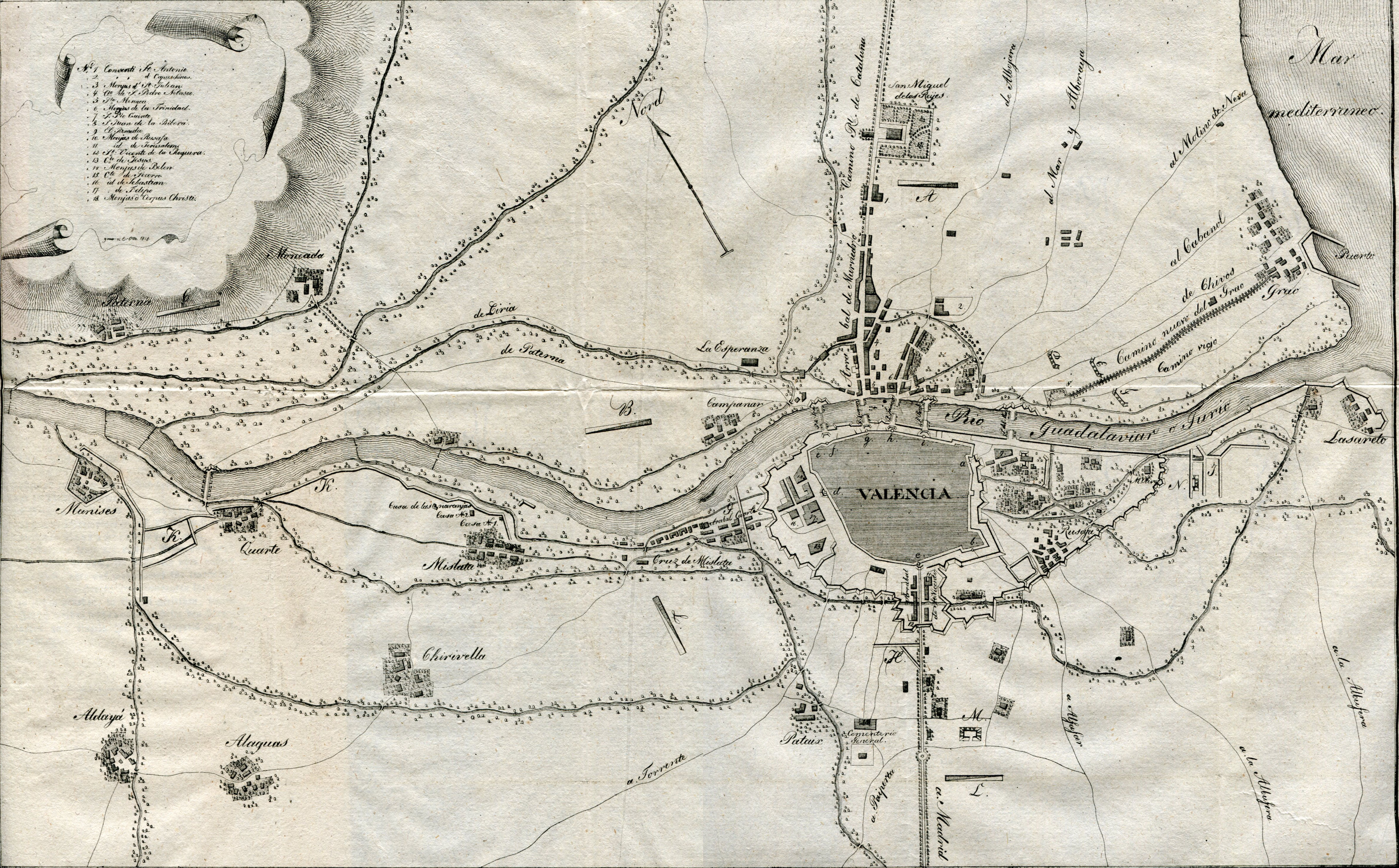
Map of the siege.

General Nicolás de Mahy, in overall command of the left flank, realized that his troops were in danger of being encircled. He ordered an immediate retreat and the divisions of Obispo and Villacampa, as well as Creagh's brigade made their escape to the south. Blake ordered Lardizabal and Zayas to retire within Valencia. The veteran units cleanly disengaged but were doomed to be trapped in the city. Suchet rapidly ringed the city with his army.

With a population of 100,000, a lack of food, and obsolete defenses, Valencia was in no condition to sustain a siege. On the night of 28 December, Blake tried to break out of the city. The attempt failed except for a spearhead of 500 troops which got away. Suchet wasted little time, digging the first siege parallels on 1 January and taking the outer defenses under fire three days later. As the bombardment intensified, Blake capitulated and handed over Valencia on 9 January.

== Results ==
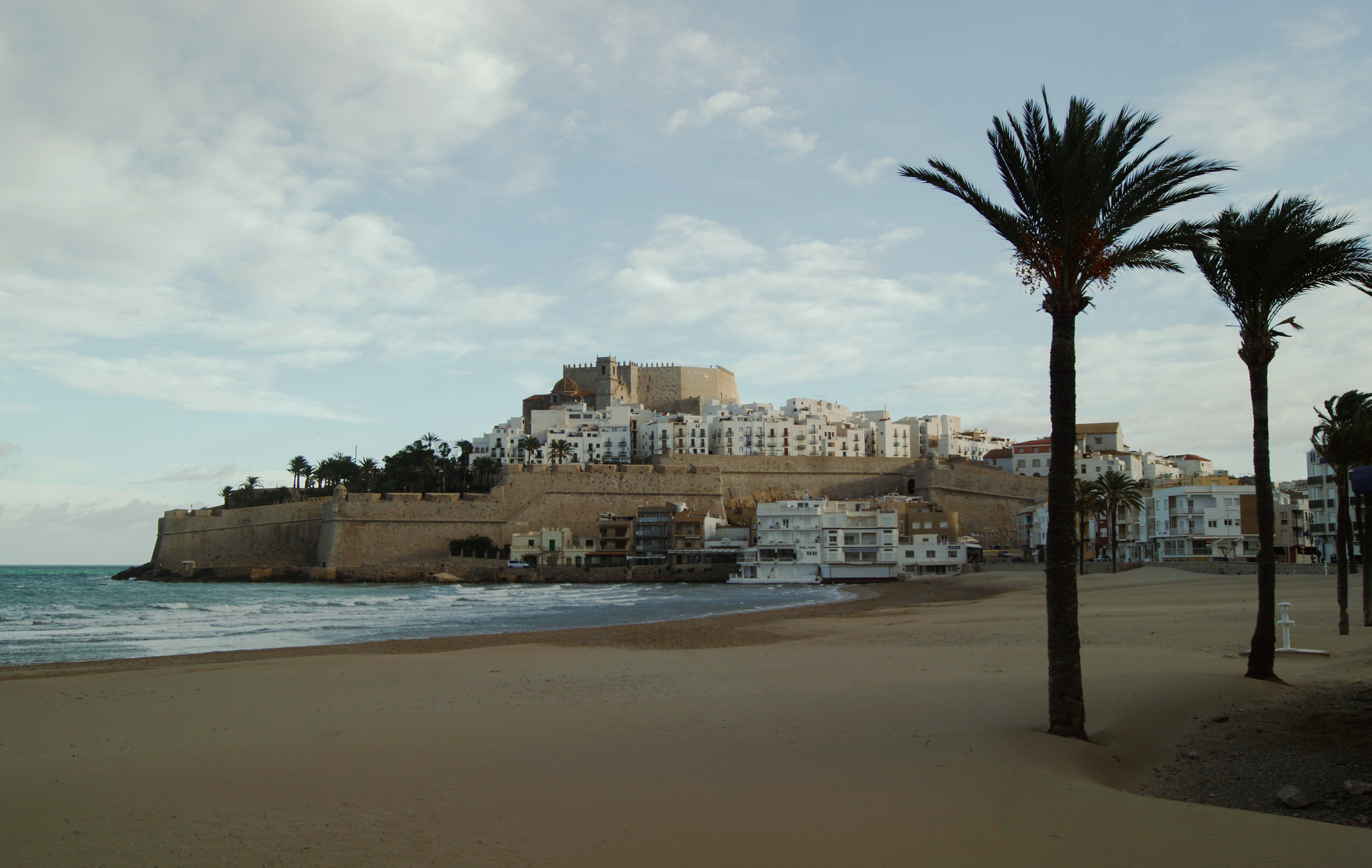
Photo of the castle of Peñiscola on a headland over the Mediterranean Sea.

For the loss of about 2,000 killed and wounded, Suchet succeeded in capturing 16,270 Spanish soldiers, 21 colors, and 374 guns. In addition, 4,011 Spanish troops died in battle or from disease. All of Blake's cavalry, plus the units of Obispo, Villacampa, and Creagh avoided capture, but his best troops became prisoners. Blake performed poorly throughout the siege and the citizens of Valencia despised him for his feeble efforts. The French held the Spanish general in prison near Paris until 1814. Suchet levied an indemnity on the surrendered city of 53 million francs. Boussart received a promotion to General of Division and would die from his many battle injuries in August 1813.

Suchet continued to advance to the south, capturing the port of Dénia. However, with Napoleon transferring troops from Spain to support his upcoming invasion of Russia, operations soon ground to a halt due to a lack of soldiers. Suchet also fell seriously ill with a fever and was out of action for weeks. This allowed the remnants of Blake's army under Mahy to recover. In the meantime, Napoleon ennobled his victorious marshal with the title Duke of Albufera, after the name of a lagoon south of Valencia.

Far to the north, General Joaquín Ibáñez Cuevas y de Valonga, Baron de Eroles ambushed a French battalion at a place on the coast southwest of Tarragona called Col de Balaguer. On 18 January, 4,000 Spanish troops, including 250 cavalry and two cannons, captured one battalion of the 121st Line Infantry Regiment. Out of about 850 troops, only the governor of the fortress of Tortosa, General of Brigade Jacques Mathurin Lafosse and 22 dragoons escaped the trap. General of Division Maurice Mathieu exacted revenge on Eroles less than a week later. In heavy fog, Eroles engaged what he thought was an enemy battalion on 24 January, in the Battle of Altafulla. In fact, it was Mathieu's 8,000-strong division of six French and two German battalions. At the cost of a few casualties, the French crushed the outnumbered Spanish force, inflicting a loss of 2,000 killed, wounded, and captured as well as taking both cannons.

On 20 January, Severoli laid siege to Peñiscola with his division of 3,000 men and six guns. The port, between Valencia and Tarragona, was known as "Little Gibraltar" because it seemed virtually impregnable. The Spanish commander General Garcia Navarro, however, was pro-French and quickly came to terms with Severoli, handing over the castle on 2 February and surrendering his 1,000 troops.

Arthur Wellesley, 1st Duke of Wellington's crushing defeat of Marshal Auguste Marmont at the Battle of Salamanca on 22 July 1812 caused King Joseph Bonaparte to abandon Madrid on 11 August. Because Suchet had a secure base at Valencia, Joseph and Marshal Jean-Baptiste Jourdan retreated there and were joined by Marshals Suchet and Nicolas Soult. Together, Joseph and the three marshals worked out a plan to recapture Madrid and drive Wellington from central Spain. Their subsequent counteroffensive caused the British general to lift the Siege of Burgos and retreat to Portugal in the autumn of 1812.

== Aftermath ==
The guerilla war proceeded till the end of the Peninsular war.

The Spanish conventional warfare proceeded till the end of the Peninsular war.

Napoleon had ended his invasion of Spain with the occupation of Madrid.

The third Portuguese campaign ended with the French retreat out of Portugal.

The Allied campaign in Spain started with the Siege of Ciudad Rodrigo.

== Notes ==
Preceded by Battle of Arroyo dos Molinos	Napoleonic Wars; Siege of Valencia (1812)	Succeeded by Siege of Ciudad Rodrigo (1812)
