= Battle of Castalla =

1813 battle during the Peninsular War

- Part of the Peninsular War
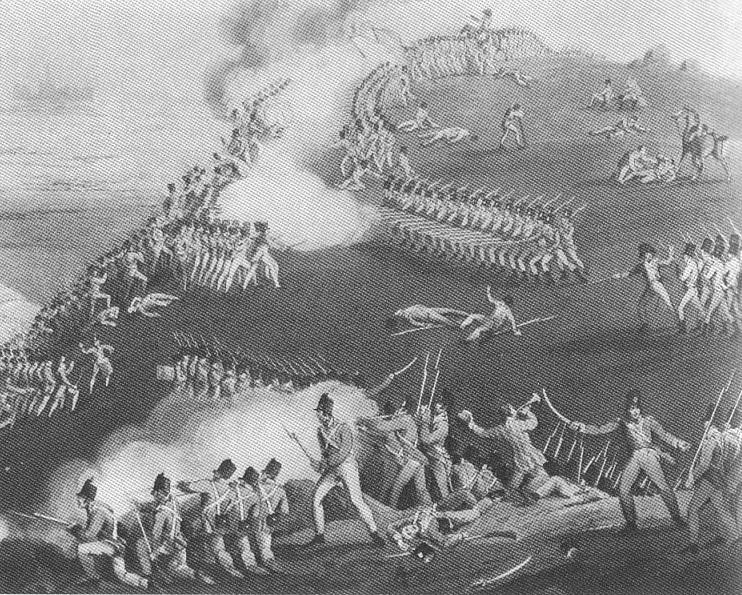
- Illustration of the battle
Date	13 April 1813
Location	Castalla, Spain 38°36′N 0°40′W
Result	Anglo-Spanish victory

Belligerents
(France) French Empire	United Kingdom; Spain; Kingdom of Sicily

Commanders and leaders
(France) Marshal Suchet	(United Kingdom) John Murray

Strength
13,564 to 15,000; 24 guns	17,000 to 18,716; 30 guns

Casualties and losses
Biar: 300; Castalla: 1,400	Biar: 301, 2 guns Castalla: 700

Peninsular War: Aragón Catalonia
current battle

In the Battle of Castalla on 13 April 1813, an Anglo-Spanish-Sicilian force commanded by Lieutenant General Sir John Murray fought Marshal Louis Gabriel Suchet's French Army of Valencia and Aragon. Murray's troops successfully repelled a series of French attacks on their hilltop position, causing Suchet's III corps to retreat. The action took place during the Peninsular War, part of the Napoleonic Wars. Castalla is located 35 kilometers north-northwest of Alicante, Spain.

General Arthur Wellesley, Marquess of Wellington wanted to prevent Suchet from reinforcing the other French armies in Spain. He ordered Murray, whose army had been built up to over 18,000 Allied troops, to accomplish this purpose. Murray's manoeuvres were ineffective and prompted Suchet to lash out against his force. The French marshal fell upon a nearby Spanish force, beating it with heavy losses. Suchet then focused on crushing Murray. One of the British brigadiers, Frederick Adam conducted a rear guard action on 12 April, allowing Murray to draw up his army in a formidable defensive position near Castalla. On the 13th, Suchet's frontal attacks were repulsed with heavy losses by British troops under Adam and John Mackenzie and by Spanish troops led by Samuel Ford Whittingham. The French withdrew and Murray did not follow up his victory.

== Background ==
Alone among Napoleon's marshals, Suchet won his baton by his victories in Spain. However, he avoided cooperating with his fellow French commanders and acted as though the provinces of Aragon and Valencia were his private kingdom. Even so, General Arthur Wellesley, Marquess Wellington knew that if Suchet's forces intervened in the battles in central and northern Spain, things might go badly for the British army. So Wellington requested that amphibious operations be directed against the east coast of Spain in order to keep Suchet's men occupied.

Since the summer of 1812, an 8,000-strong Anglo-Sicilian force, joined by about 6,000 Spanish troops from Menorca, occupied the port of Alicante on the east coast of Spain. The army frequently changed generals but did nothing to contribute to the Anglo-Allied war effort. In February 1813, Murray was appointed to command the reinforced 18,000-man force.

== Prelude ==
In early April, after making some indecisive maneuvers, Murray posted his small army at Villena, northwest of Alicante. Meanwhile, Suchet decided to surprise the British general and his Spanish allies. The French marshal split his force into two columns, sending one column under General of Division Jean Isidore Harispe to attack a Spanish force at Yecla. A second column under Suchet's personal command marched against Murray at Villena.

On 11 April 1813, Harispe fell upon General Mijares and his 3,000 Murcians at Yecla. In a surprise attack led by the 4th Hussar and 24th Dragoon Regiments, the Spanish troops were routed, losing 400 killed and 1,000 prisoners. Two infantry battalions were virtually annihilated. The French admitted losses of 18 killed and 61 wounded.

Murray heard about the disaster by noon that day. He immediately beat a retreat toward Alicante, dropping off a 2,200-man all-arms brigade under Colonel Frederick Adam at the pass of Biar to cover his withdrawal. On the morning of 12 April, Suchet captured a Spanish battalion at Villena and set out in pursuit of Murray. At Biar, the French came up with Adam's rearguard but were unable to overrun the well-handled force, which consisted of British, King's German Legion, Italian and Spanish elements. In a brilliant five-hour action, Adam successfully fended off his French pursuers, allowing Murray to concentrate his army at Castalla. In one incident, Suchet's cavalry raced after their enemies after flushing the Allied soldiers from Biar. But this attempt to turn a retreat into a rout failed when the French troopers charged into a neatly executed ambush by three companies of the 2/27th Foot. During the action, the French suffered about 300 casualties and Adam lost 260 killed and wounded plus 41 missing. The British colonel was forced to abandon two of his four cannons.

== Battle ==
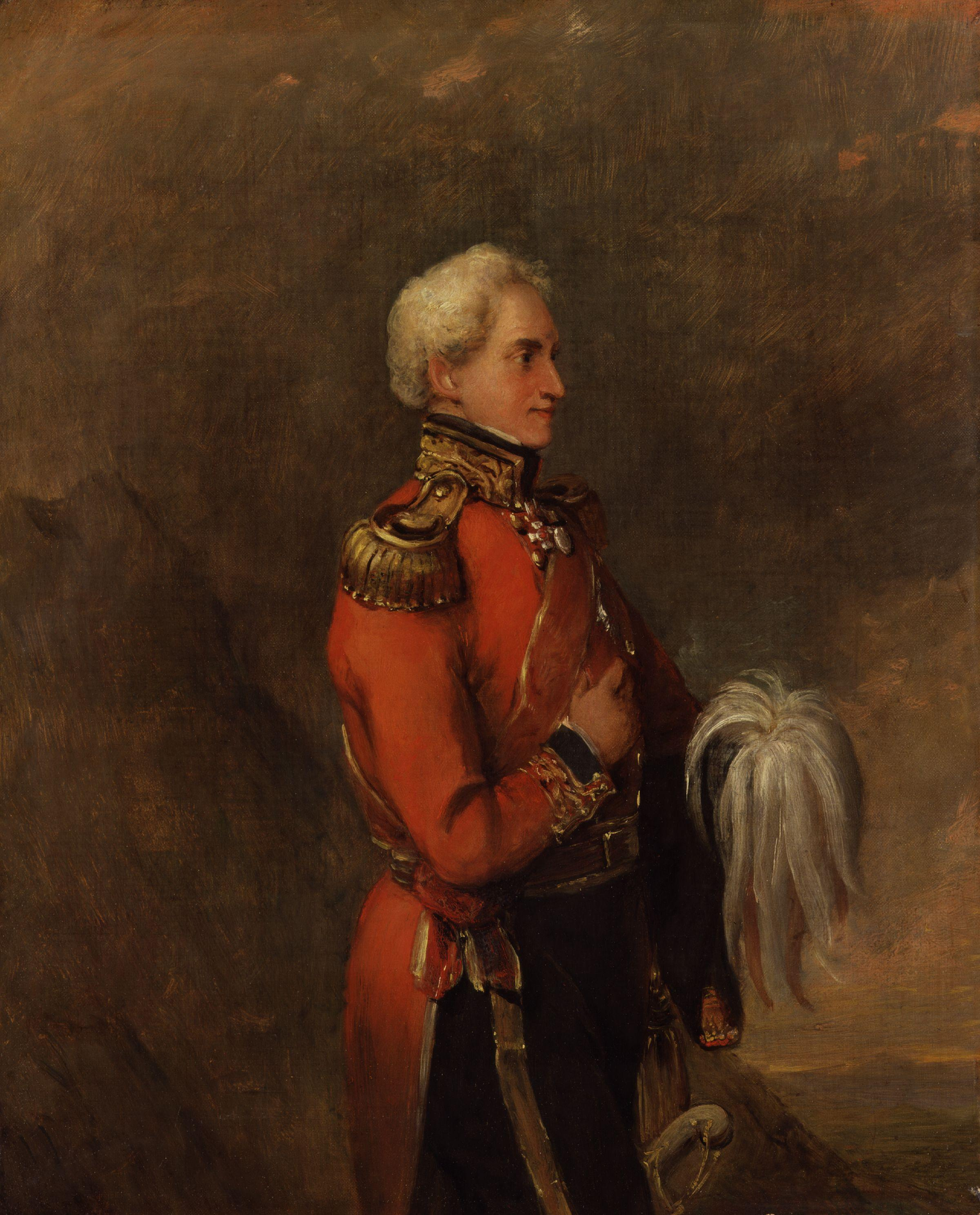
Frederick Adam performed well while leading a brigade at Biar and Castalla.

Murray's army consisted of 18,716 men organized into an advanced guard, two Anglo-Italian divisions, two Spanish divisions, cavalry, and artillery. Adam's advanced guard consisted of 1,179 men in three battalions and various detachments. Lieutenant General William Henry Clinton's 1st Division numbered 4,036 men in five battalions. General John Mackenzie's counted 4,045 soldiers in five battalions. Colonel Samuel Ford Whittingham's 1st Spanish Division had 3,901 troops in six battalions, while General Phillip Roche's 2nd Spanish Division included 4,019 men in five battalions. There were 1,036 cavalry troopers in nine squadrons and 30 guns manned by about 500 artillerists.

The strong Castalla position consisted of a castle-topped ridge that overlooked a deep stream bed. A spur projecting forward from the ridge tended to split any attack on the position. Further, a flooded stream protected the right of the Anglo-Allied line. Murray put Whittingham's Spanish division in a fortified position on the left flank. Adam's brigade held the left-center and Mackenzie's division held the right-center. The British commander posted Clinton's division on the right flank. Part of General Roche's division was placed in front of Clinton, supporting a cavalry screen. The remainder of Roche's men and the rest of the cavalry were positioned behind Castalla castle in reserve.

Suchet had one cavalry and three infantry divisions available, a total of 13,564 men including gunners. General of Division André Joseph Boussart commanded 1,424 horsemen in eight squadrons. In the absence of General of Division Louis Francois Felix Musnier, General of Brigade Louis Benoit Robert led the 1st Division's 5,084 men in eight battalions. Harispe's 2nd Division counted 4,052 troops in six battalions, while General of Division Pierre-Joseph Habert's 3rd Division included 2,722 soldiers in four battalions. The French had 282 gunners manning 24 artillery pieces.

Suchet planned to send Robert and Habert with their divisions at the center of Murray's line. Meanwhile, five voltigeur (light) companies would threaten the extreme Anglo-Allied left flank and Boussart's cavalry would envelop the enemy right flank. Harispe's division was kept in reserve. The French expected that a hard blow would send the Spanish and Italian infantry fleeing. Before the action commenced, Murray ordered Whittingham to shift his division west in order to overlap the French right flank. Accordingly, Whittingham began to carry out his instructions by putting his troops in motion and opening up a gap in the center.

At noon on 13 April, the French troops surged forward. Robert's attack was carried out in five columns. On his own initiative, Whittingham ignored his orders and moved his division back to its original position. He detached one battalion to deal with the voltigeurs. Robert's three right-hand columns, together with the skirmishers, were repulsed by Whittingham's steady Spaniards. The two left-most columns came up against Adam and were likewise hurled back. In a short, close-range musketry duel, Adam's 2/27th Foot, deployed in line, inflicted 369 casualties on the 121st Line's attack column. Habert's advance was blocked by Mackenzie and Boussart's cavalrymen were unable to cross the flooded stream.

With his infantry defeated, his cavalry off to one flank and his men outnumbered, Suchet found himself in a difficult spot. Murray proved slow to take advantage of his success, however, and the French were able to retreat almost unmolested. Suchet's rearguard ably defended the pass of Biar and allowed the French to get away with little additional loss.

== Results ==
The Anglo-Allied force lost 440 casualties. Whittingham's men suffered 233 casualties, Adam lost 70 and Mackenzie lost 47. Suchet admitted 800 casualties at Yecla, Biar and Castalla, but this is probably too low. Murray claimed to have inflicted 2,500 losses on his enemies. A more likely figure is 1,300 French casualties at Castalla. Murray failed to benefit from his victory when he continued his retreat to Alicante. The next action in the theater was the Siege of Tarragona.

== Orders of Battle ==
=== Allied Order of Battle ===
Murray's army counted 17,080 infantry, 1,036 cavalry, and 30 guns. It consisted of two Anglo-Italian and two Spanish infantry divisions, plus Adam's brigade. The army was organized as follows. Gates listed strengths and division numbers.

- Lieutenant-General John Murray, 8th Baronet
  - 1st Anglo-Italian Division: Lieutenant General William Henry Clinton (4,036)
    - 1/10th Foot
    - 1/58th Foot
    - 1/81st Foot
    - 2nd Italian Regiment (1 battalion) - it:Italian Levy
    - Roll-Dillon Battalion
  - 2nd Anglo-Italian Division: General John Mackenzie (4,045)
    - 1/27th Foot
    - 4th King's German Legion Line Battalion
    - 6th King's German Legion Line Battalion
    - Sicilian Estero (foreign) Regiment (2 battalions)
  - Independent Brigade: Colonel Frederick Adam (1,179)
    - 2/27th Foot
    - 1st Italian Regiment (1 battalion) - Italian Levy
    - it:Calabrian Free Corps (1 battalion)
    - Light companies of 3rd and 8th KGL Line battalions
    - 20th Light Dragoons (2 squadrons attached)
    - Cazadores a Caballo Olivenza Regiment (2 squadrons attached)
    - Foreign Hussars (1 troop attached) (Note: 'Foreign Hussars Also called the Foreign Troop of Light Dragoons. Formed during 1810 in Sicily with men who could ride from various foreign regiments in British service.')
    - 1st Sicilian Cavalry
  - 1st Spanish Division: Colonel Samuel Ford Whittingham (3,901)
    - Cordoba Infantry Regiment (1 battalion)
    - Mallorca Infantry Regiment (1 battalion)
    - Guadalajara Infantry Regiment (1 battalion)
    - 2/Burgos Infantry Regiment (1 battalion)
    - 2/Murcia Infantry Regiment (1 battalion)
    - 5th Grenadier battalion
  - 2nd Spanish Division: General Phillip Roche (4,019)
    - Aragon Volunteers (1 battalion)
    - Portuguese Volunteers (1 battalion)
    - Alicante Infantry Regiment
    - Chinchilla Infantry Regiment
    - Canarias Infantry Regiment
  - Cavalry: 9 squadrons (1,036)
  - Artillery: 30 guns (500)

=== French Order of Battle ===
Suchet's force numbered 11,848 infantry, 1,424 cavalry, and 24 artillery pieces. The Army of Aragon and Valencia was organized as follows. The order of battle is from Smith's Castalla article, unless otherwise noted. Smith listed Robert's four regiments as having "1 bns each". It is assumed that this is a misprint for "2 bns each" because Gates listed 8 battalions in this division. Gates gave the unit strengths.

- Marshal Louis Gabriel Suchet
  - 1st Division: General of Brigade Louis Benoit Robert (5,084)
    - 1st Light Infantry Regiment (2 battalions)
    - 3rd Light Infantry Regiment (2 battalions)
    - 114th Line Infantry Regiment (2 battalions)
    - 121st Line Infantry Regiment (2 battalions)
  - 2nd Division: General of Division Jean Isidore Harispe (4,052) (not engaged) Smith did not list Harispe's regiments at Castalla. The units listed here are from the Battle of Ordal order of battle.
    - 7th Line Infantry Regiment (2 battalions)
    - 44th Line Infantry Regiment (2 battalions)
    - 116th Line Infantry Regiment (2 battalions)
  - 3rd Division: General of Division Pierre-Joseph Habert (2,722)
    - 14th Line Infantry Regiment (2 battalions)
    - 16th Line Infantry Regiment (1 battalion)
    - 117th Line Infantry Regiment (1 battalion)
  - Cavalry Division: General of Division André Joseph Boussart (1,424). Smith spelled the name "Boussard".
    - 24th Dragoons
    - 13th Cuirassiers
    - 4th Hussars Smith did not list the 4th Hussars at Castalla. Since he placed them at Yecla, they may have been present though perhaps not engaged.
- Artillery: 24 guns (282)

== Bibliography ==
- Bodart, Gaston (1908). Militär-historisches Kriegs-Lexikon (1618-1905).
- Chartrand, René (2000). Émigré and Foreign Troops in British Service (2): 1803-15. Men-at-Arms 335. Illustrated by Patrice Courcelle. Osprey Publishing. ISBN 978-1-85-532859-4.
- Gates, David (2002). The Spanish Ulcer: A History of the Peninsular War. London: Pimlico. ISBN 0-7126-9730-6.
- Glover, Michael (2001). The Peninsular War 1807-1814. London: Penguin. ISBN 0-14-139041-7.
- Kim, Yuhan (2023). To Conquer and to Keep Volume 2 1811-1814: Suchet and the War for Eastern Spain. Solihull: Helion. ISBN 978-1-80-451396-5.
- Lipscombe, Nick (2016). Wellington's Eastern Front: The Campaign on the East Coast of Spain 1810-1814. Barnsley: Pen & Sword Military. ISBN 978-1-47-385071-2.
- Ojala, Jeanne A. (1987). Chandler, David (ed.). Suchet: The Peninsular Marshal. New York: Macmillan. ISBN 0-02-905930-5.
- Riley, J. P. (2000). Napoleon and the World War of 1813: Lessons in Coalition Warfighting. Portland, Oregon: Frank Cass Publishers. ISBN 0-7146-4893-0.
- Smith, Digby (1998). The Napoleonic Wars Data Book. London: Greenhill. ISBN 1-85367-276-9.

Preceded by Battle of Berezina	Napoleonic Wars; Battle of Castalla	Succeeded by Battle of Lützen (1813)
