= Battle of Castalla (1812) =

1812 battle of the Peninsular War

- Part of the Peninsular War
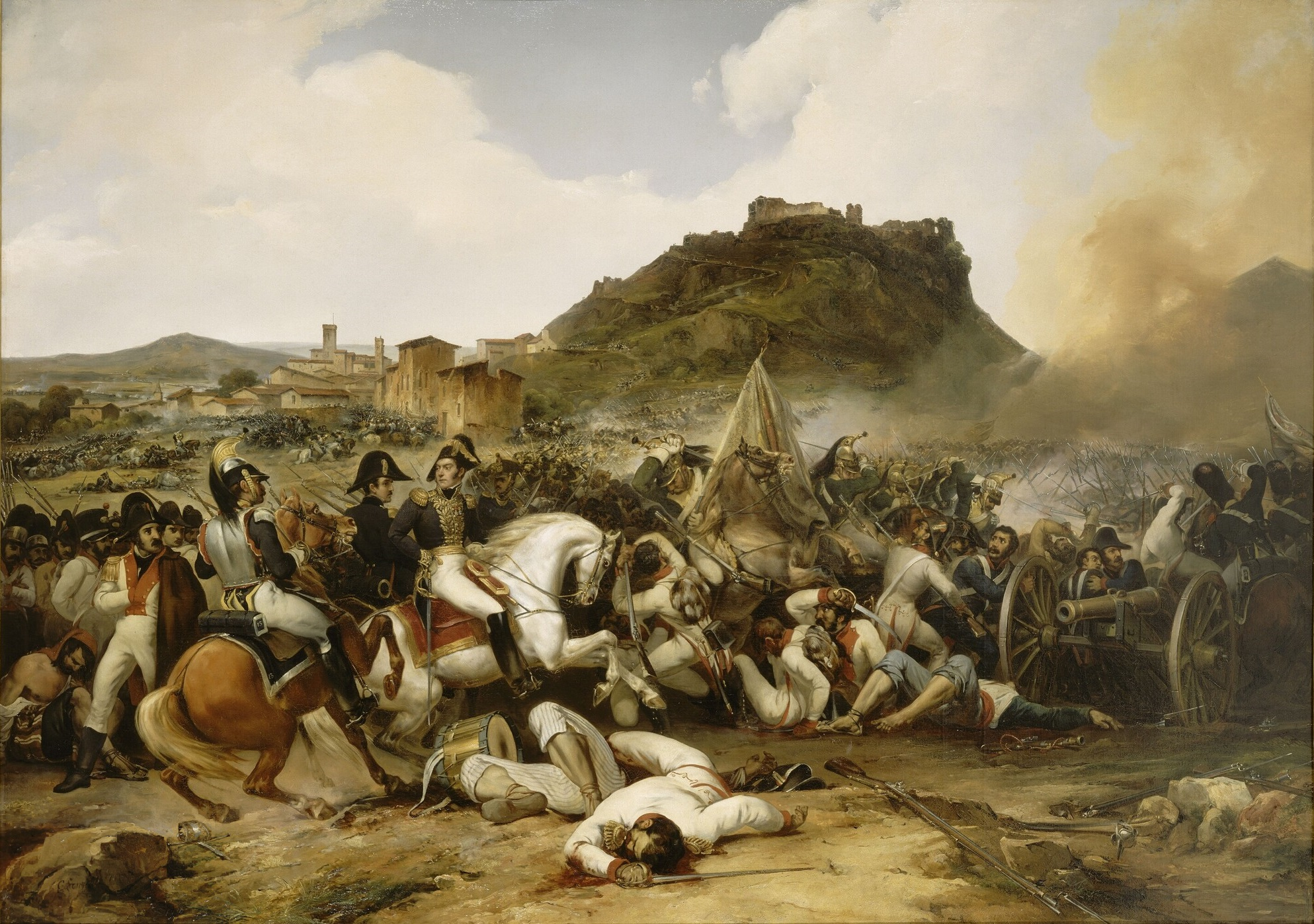
- Battle of Castalla, 21 July 1812; Jean-Charles Langlois, 1836
Date	21 July 1812
Location	Castalla, Spain 38°36′N 0°40′W
Result	French victory

Belligerents
First French Empire	Kingdom of Spain

Commanders and leaders
(First French Empire) Jean Harispe	Joseph O'Donnell

Units involved
(First French Empire) Army of Aragon	Army of Murcia

Strength
4,000	10,000

Casualties and losses
200	3,000; 2 guns

Peninsular War: Aragón Catalonia
current battle

In the Battle of Castalla (21 July 1812) a small Spanish army commanded by Joseph O'Donnell advanced to attack an Imperial French division under the leadership of Jean Isidore Harispe. O'Donnell's battle plan was poorly conceived and the outnumbered French smashed his center column before his right and left wings could intervene. The engagement occurred during the Peninsular War, part of the Napoleonic Wars. The battle was fought near Castalla, 32 kilometres (20 mi) north-west of Alicante, Spain.

== Background ==
In the successful Siege of Valencia and subsidiary operations, Marshal Louis Gabriel Suchet's French army conquered much of the province of Valencia. To the south, the Spanish Army of Murcia regrouped in an attempt to halt further French advances. On 16 January 1812, the Spanish defeated an attempt by General of Division Louis-Pierre Montbrun and 5,500 French soldiers to seize their base at Alicante. An Anglo-Sicilian expedition under General Thomas Maitland was due to arrive at Alicante and General Arthur Wellesley, Marquess of Wellington asked Captain General Joseph O'Donnell to conduct a holding operation.

== Battle ==
Ignoring Wellington's advice, O'Donnell formed his 11,000-strong army into three attack columns designed to envelop one of General of Division Jean Isidore Harispe's brigades. Abandoning the town of Castalla, Colonel Jacques-Antoine-Adrien Delort drew up his soldiers on a nearby ridge. As O'Donnell's three center brigades probed the position, the French 24th Dragoon regiment unexpectedly arrived on the battlefield and delivered a series of crushing blows. The French cavalry and infantry killed or wounded 1,000 Spanish soldiers and rounded up 2,135 prisoners. The Spanish right and left columns made such wide circuits of the battlefield that the fighting was over before they could influence the result. When Maitland landed he found the Army of Murcia in no shape to conduct operations for several months. The day after Castalla, Wellington won a decisive victory over the French at Salamanca and threatened to break Napoleon's grip on Spain.
