= Castalla =

- Municipality
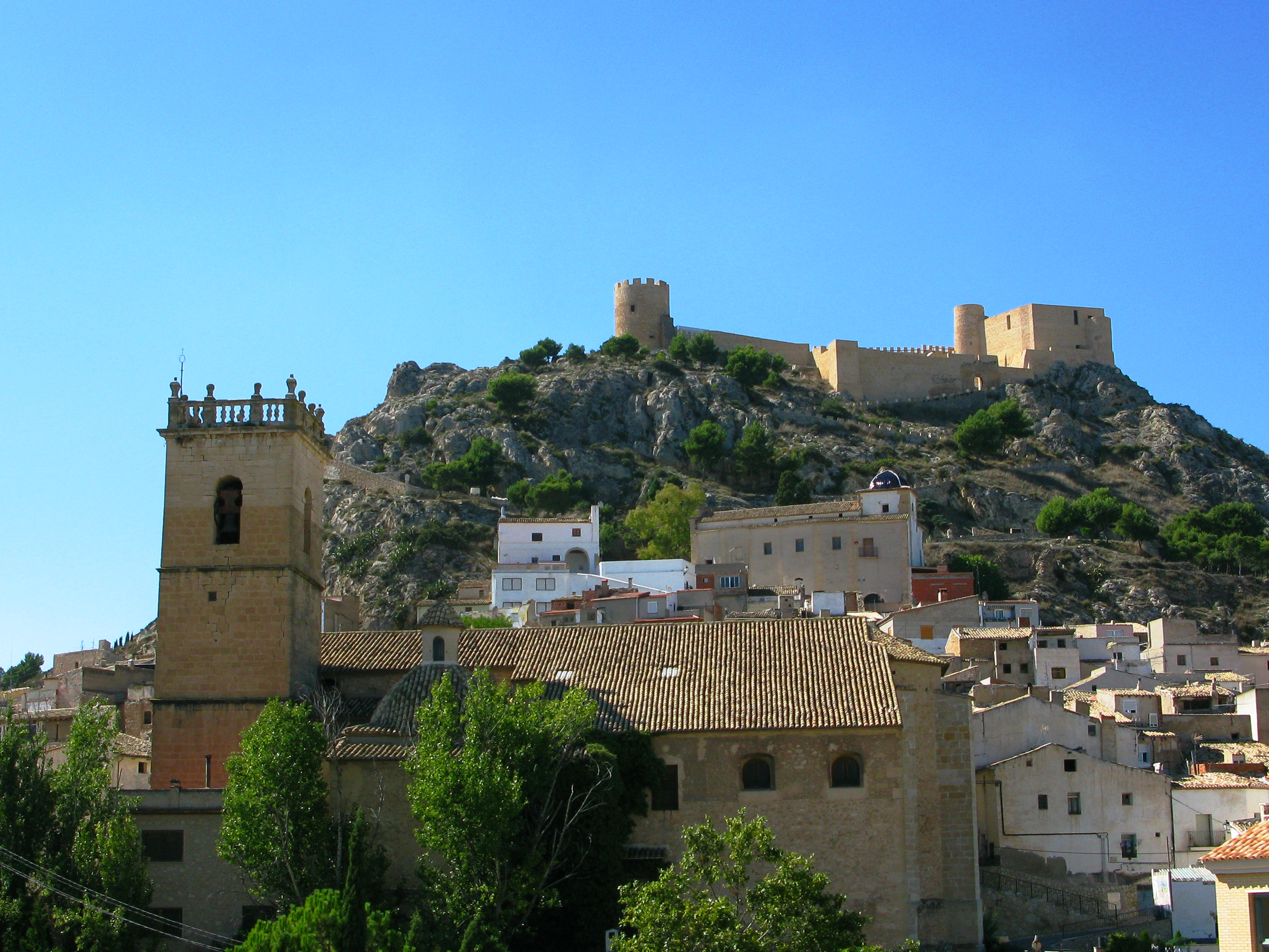
- Church of the Assumption, Hermitage of Blood and Castle

- Flag Coat of arms

- Location in Spain
- Coordinates: 38°35′48″N 0°40′15″W
- Country: Spain
- Autonomous community: Valencian Community
- Province: Alicante
- Comarca: Alcoià
- Judicial district: Alcoy

Government
  - Mayor: Antonio Bernabeu Bernabeu (Ciudadanos)

Area
  - Total: 114.6 km^{2} (44.2 sq mi)
- Elevation: 675 m (2,215 ft)

Population (2025-01-01)
  - Total: 11,908
  - Density: 103.9/km^{2} (269.1/sq mi)
- Demonym: Castelluts i castelludes
- Time zone: UTC+1 (CET)
  - Summer (DST): UTC+2 (CEST)
- Postal code: 03420
- Official language(s): Valencian, Spanish
- Website: Official website

Castalla (Valencian: [kasˈtaʎa]; Spanish: [kasˈtaʎa]) is a town located in the comarca of Alcoià, in the province of Alicante, Spain. Castalla is located in a mountainous area, 35 km from Alicante.

== Location ==
Castalla Castle sits on a hill overlooking the valley and the town is around, at the foot of the hill, 680 m above sea level. Castalla La Hoya, whose history is Castalla capital, is a broad valley in the form of T oriented to the southeast and sandwiched between various mountain formations. Castalla occupies the west and southwest of La Hoya which interlock like Maigmó mountains (1296 m), Cati (1260 m) or Argenya (1230 m). The climate of the area can be locked in a mid-mountain Mediterranean climate. The average annual temperature is around 17 degrees. The rains are not abundant, around 400mm per year, but mountain ranges favor the formation of cloudiness and local rainfall, increasing these with altitude. Snowfall is common in winter days of January and February. Communicates with Alicante and Valencia along the A-7.

In the castle are Neolithic settlements, Bronze Age, Iberian, Roman (who called it "Castra Alta", high strength) and Arabs, historically, the castle has been the core around which they would bringing together the amullarada city housing.

== History ==
James I of Aragon took the castle from the Moors after the conquest of Biar and integrated it into the Kingdom of Valencia, under the Treaty of Almizra (1244), was in Castalla border with Castile. For this reason, started rebuilding the castle and was consecrated the first church in the place where the present chapel of the Blood.

Since its conquest, was awarded the property Castalla manor to. In 1336, King Pedro IV of Aragon became the property of the Crown. In 1362 the barony was created Castalla, which was donated to Don Ramon de Vilanova. The castle was inherited in 1729 by the Marquis de Dos Aguas, until in 1989 it became municipal property.

During the War of Succession, and the whole region Castalla sided with the Bourbon side, and the result of this was that, after the war, Philip V granted him a number of privileges and the title of "Very Noble and Loyal Faithful."

During the War of Independence two major military actions took place in Castalla. The First Battle of Castalla, which took place on 21 July 1812, was a major defeat for the Spanish army under José O'Donnell. However, the better-known Second Battle of Castalla on 13 April 1813 was an Anglo-Spanish triumph over Marshal Louis Gabriel Suchet's French army. In the second battle, a Spanish infantry division under the leadership of Samuel Ford Whittingham particularly distinguished itself by repelling French attacks.

In 1890, Queen Regent Maria Cristina gave the town of Castalla the title of City.

The economy of Castalla is based on farming (almonds, olives and grapes) and the industries of toys, construction materials, furniture and textile.

The Moros i Cristians festival of Castalla is celebrated each September.

== Main sights ==
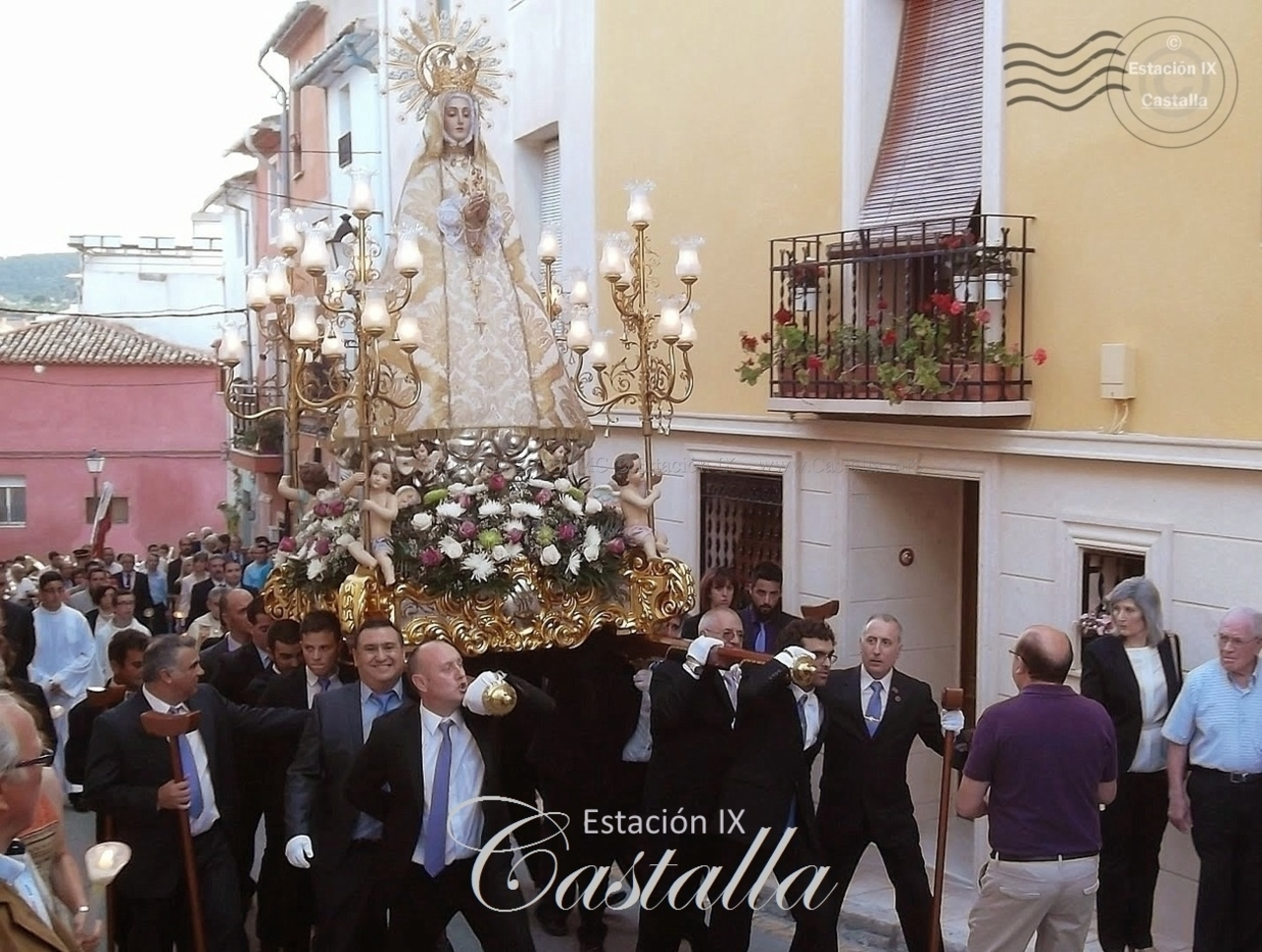
Estación IX - Castalla

Important monuments in Castalla are:

- the hilltop walled castle (11th century)
- the Hermitage of the Blood (13th century)
- the Catholic church of la Assumpció (16th century)
- the Renaissance style town hall (mid-17th century)
- the Estación IX. Located in the historic center it is the ninth place on the “Route of the Cross”, a pilgrimage which takes place every Easter.

== See also ==
- Route of the Castles of Vinalopó
