= Frederick Adam =

British Army general (1781–1853)

General The Right Honourable Sir Frederick Adam GCB GCMG
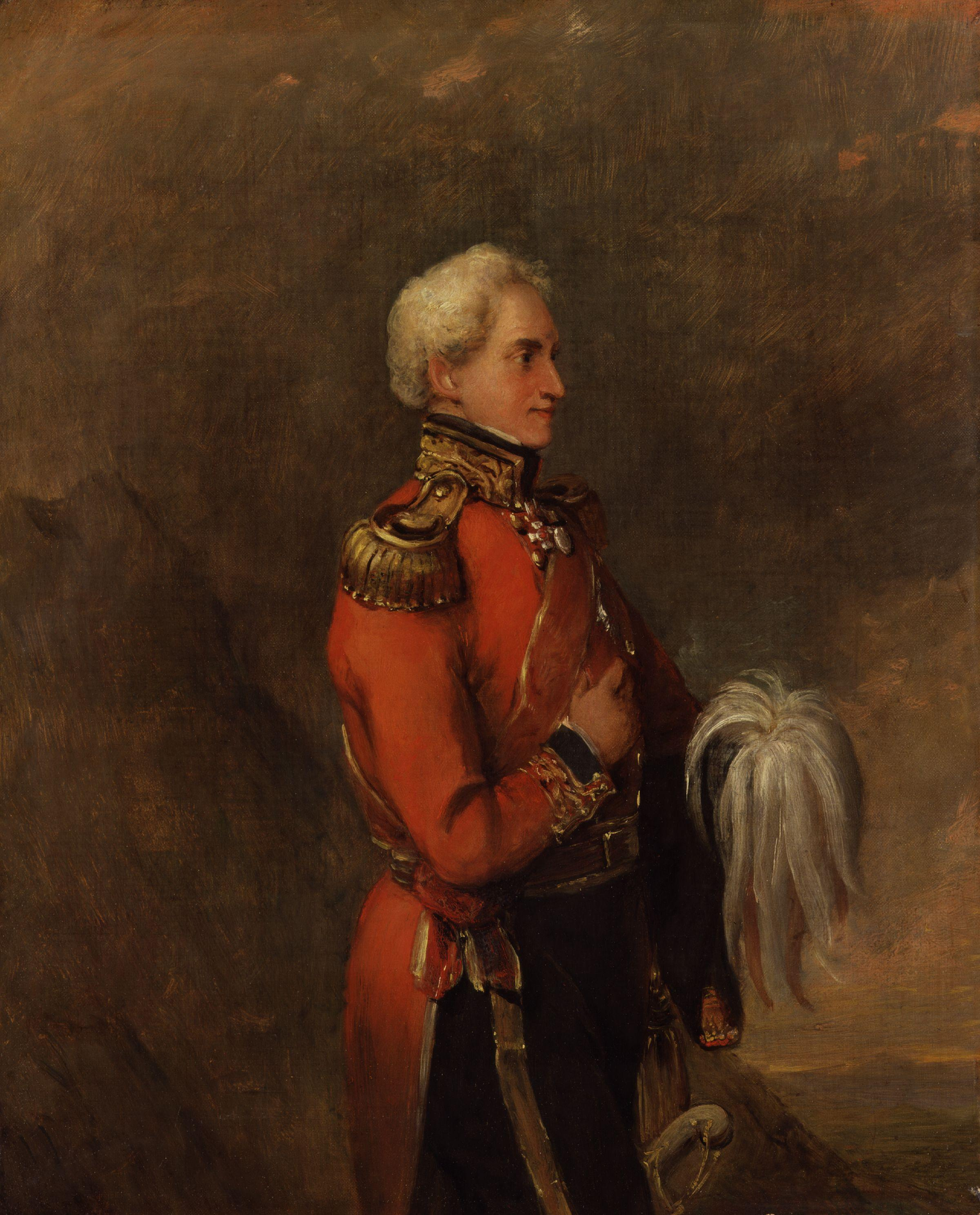
- Portrait by William Salter, 1848 or after
- Born: 17 June 1781; Scotland
- Died: 17 August 1853 (aged 72)
- Relatives: father: William Adam (MP)
- Military career
- Allegiance: Kingdom of Great Britain; United Kingdom
- Branch: British Army, Artillery
- Service years: 1795–?
- Rank: General
- Commands: 3rd (Light) Brigade
- Conflicts: Peninsular War; Battle of Castalla; Battle of Alicante; Battle of Biar; Battle of Ordal; War of the Seventh Coalition; Battle of Waterloo
- Awards: Knight Grand Cross of the Order of the Bath
- Other work: Lord High Commissioner, Ionian Islands; Governor of Madras

General Sir Frederick Adam GCB GCMG (17 June 1781 – 17 August 1853) was a Scottish major-general at the Battle of Waterloo, in command of the 3rd (Light) Brigade. He was the fourth son of William Adam of Blair Adam and his wife Eleanora, the daughter of Charles Elphinstone, 10th Lord Elphinstone. He was later a Lord High Commissioner of the Ionian Islands, who built Mon Repos, Corfu and other important landmarks in that Protectorate.

== Military career ==
He was born at the family home of Blairadam House, just north of Kelty in Fife.

At the age of fourteen in 1795, Frederick Adam entered the British Army. He trained at the artillery school at the Royal Arsenal, Woolwich. In the same year, he was commissioned as a first lieutenant and in 1796 he was promoted to second lieutenant.

He took part in the campaigns in the Netherlands and Egypt under Sir Ralph Abercromby, he was promoted to the rank of major in 1803 and a lieutenant colonel in 1804. From 1806 to 1811 he was stationed on Sicily. Between 1812 and 1813 he was in Spain fighting in the Peninsular War, where he was severely wounded at Alicante. On 12 April 1813, while commanding the Light Brigade in John Murray's expeditionary force, Adam led a brilliant rearguard action against the corps of Marshal Louis-Gabriel Suchet at Biar. The following day, his 2/27th Foot battalion inflicted 350 casualties on Suchet's 121st Line Regiment during the Battle of Castalla. He was wounded again in an action at Ordal on 13 September 1813.

=== Waterloo ===
On 18 June 1815, Adam commanded the 3rd British Brigade in Henry Clinton's 2nd Division at the Battle of Waterloo. At the crisis of the battle, Adam's 1/52nd (Light) Foot performed a left-wheel to enfilade the flank of the French Imperial Guard's main attack while the British Guards engaged the head of the column. Under fire from two directions, the French guardsmen put up a brief resistance then fled. After their unsuccessful attack on the British centre, the Guard rallied to their reserves of three (some sources say four) regiments, just south of La Haye Sainte for a last stand against the British. But a charge from Adam's brigade threw them into a state of confusion and those which were left retreated towards La Belle Alliance. It was during this stand that Colonel Hugh Halkett took the surrender of General Cambronne.

The French Imperial Guard made a last stand in squares on either side of the La Belle Alliance. General Adam's Brigade charged the square which was formed on rising ground to the (British) right of La Belle Alliance and again threw them into a state of confusion. The other square was attacked by the Prussians. The French retreated away from the battlefield towards France. The French artillery, and everything else belonging to them, fell into the hands of the British and Prussians.

Battle Order of the 3rd Light Brigade at The Battle of Waterloo
Unit	Commander	Strength	Casualties
3rd (Light) British Brigade	Major General Frederick Adam	2,937 men	698
1/52nd Regiment of Foot (Oxfordshire Light Infantry)	Lt-Colonel Sir John Colborne	1,130	199
1/71st Regiment of Foot (Highland Light Infantry)	Lt-Colonel Reyner	936	202
2/95th Regiment of Foot (Rifles)	Major Norcott	666	247
3/95th Regiment of Foot (Rifles)	Major John Ross	205	50

== Later life ==
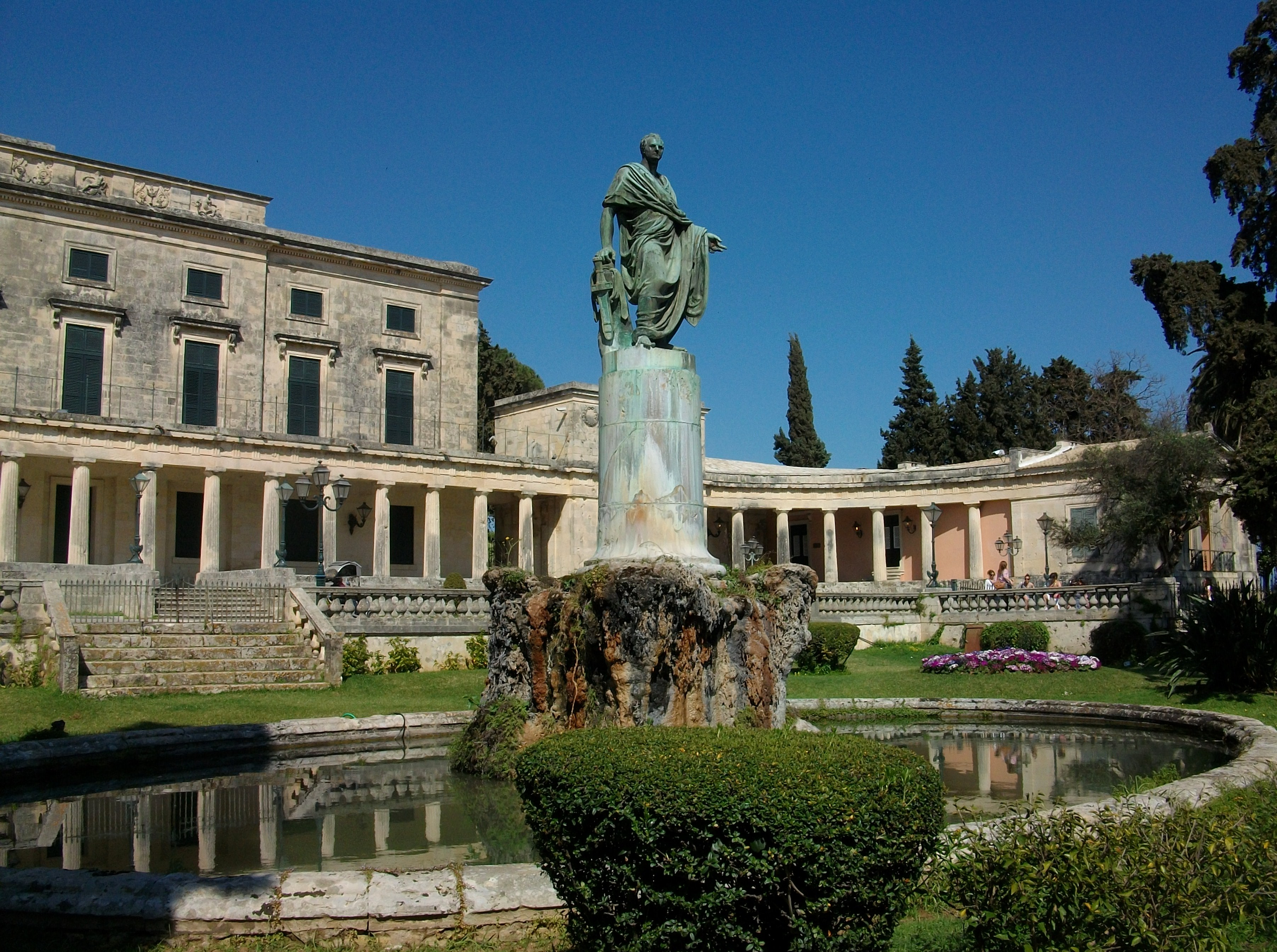
Statue by Pavlos Prosalentis in Corfu

From 1817 to 1824, Adam continued his career in the army. Between 1824 and 1832 he was a popular Lord High Commissioner of the Ionian Islands. His commissioning of the construction of public buildings on Corfu was appreciated by the local population. He was sworn of the Privy Council in 1831.

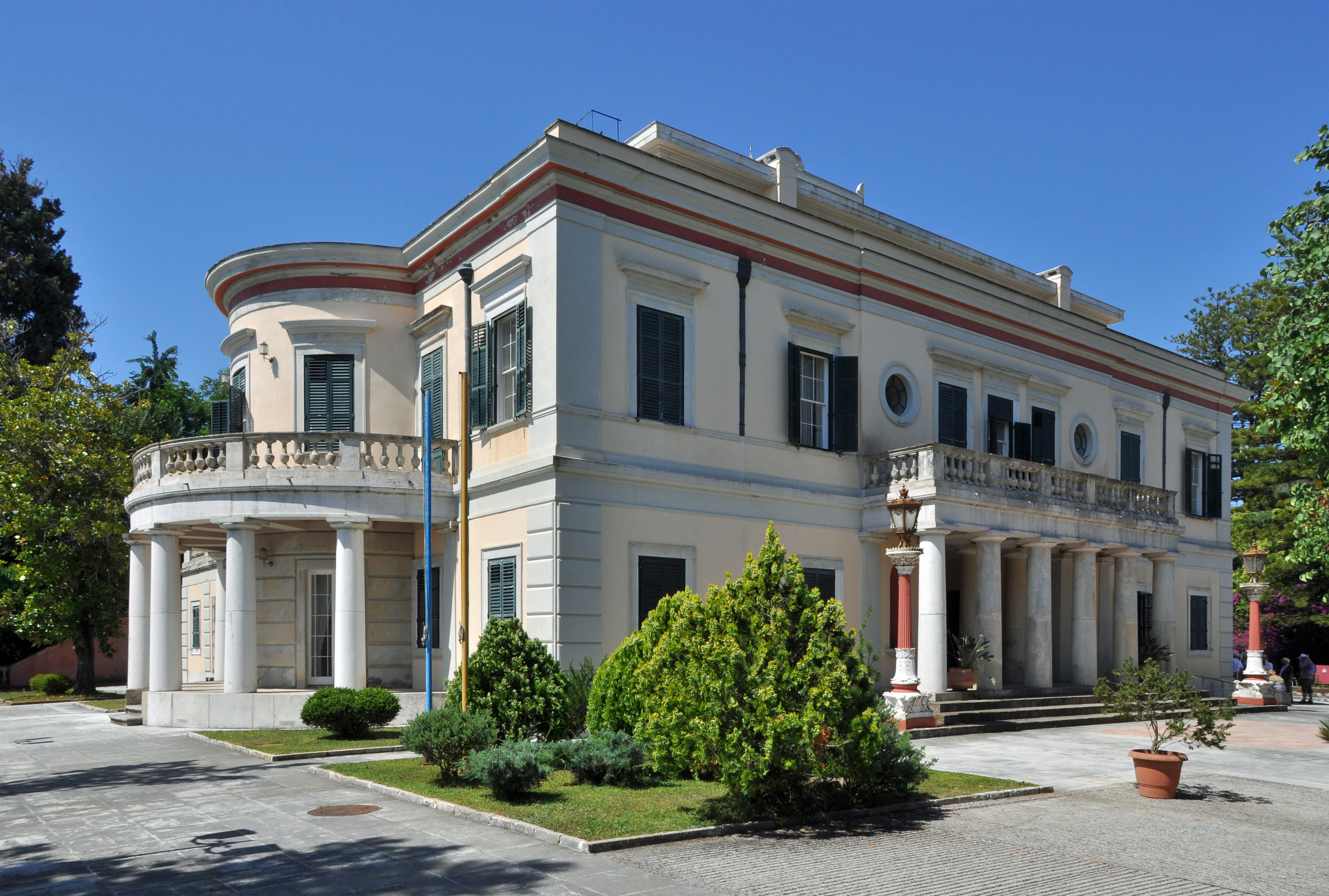
Mon Repos, Corfu

From 25 October 1832, to 4 March 1837, he was Governor of Madras and, in 1846, he was promoted to general.

== Military commands ==
Incomplete list of military commands:

- 1813 – commanded Anglo-Allied Light Brigade at Biar and Castalla.
- 1813 – commanded Anglo-Allied Advanced Guard at Ordal.
- 1815 – commanded 3rd (Light) British Brigade at Waterloo.
- 1829 – 1835 Colonel of 73rd Perthshire Regiment of Foot.
- 1835 – Colonel of 57th Foot who were stationed in India.
- 1843 – Colonel 21st Fusiliers.

Military offices
Preceded by Lord Harris	Colonel of the 73rd Regiment of Foot; 1829–1835	Succeeded by Lord Harris
Preceded by Sir William Inglis	Colonel of the 57th (West Middlesex) Regiment of Foot; 1835–1843	Succeeded by Sir Henry Hardinge
Preceded by The Lord Forbes	Colonel of the 21st Regiment of Foot (Royal North British Fuzileers); 1843–1853	Succeeded by Sir George De Lacy Evans
