= Battle of Altafulla =

1812 battle during the Peninsular War

- Part of Peninsular War
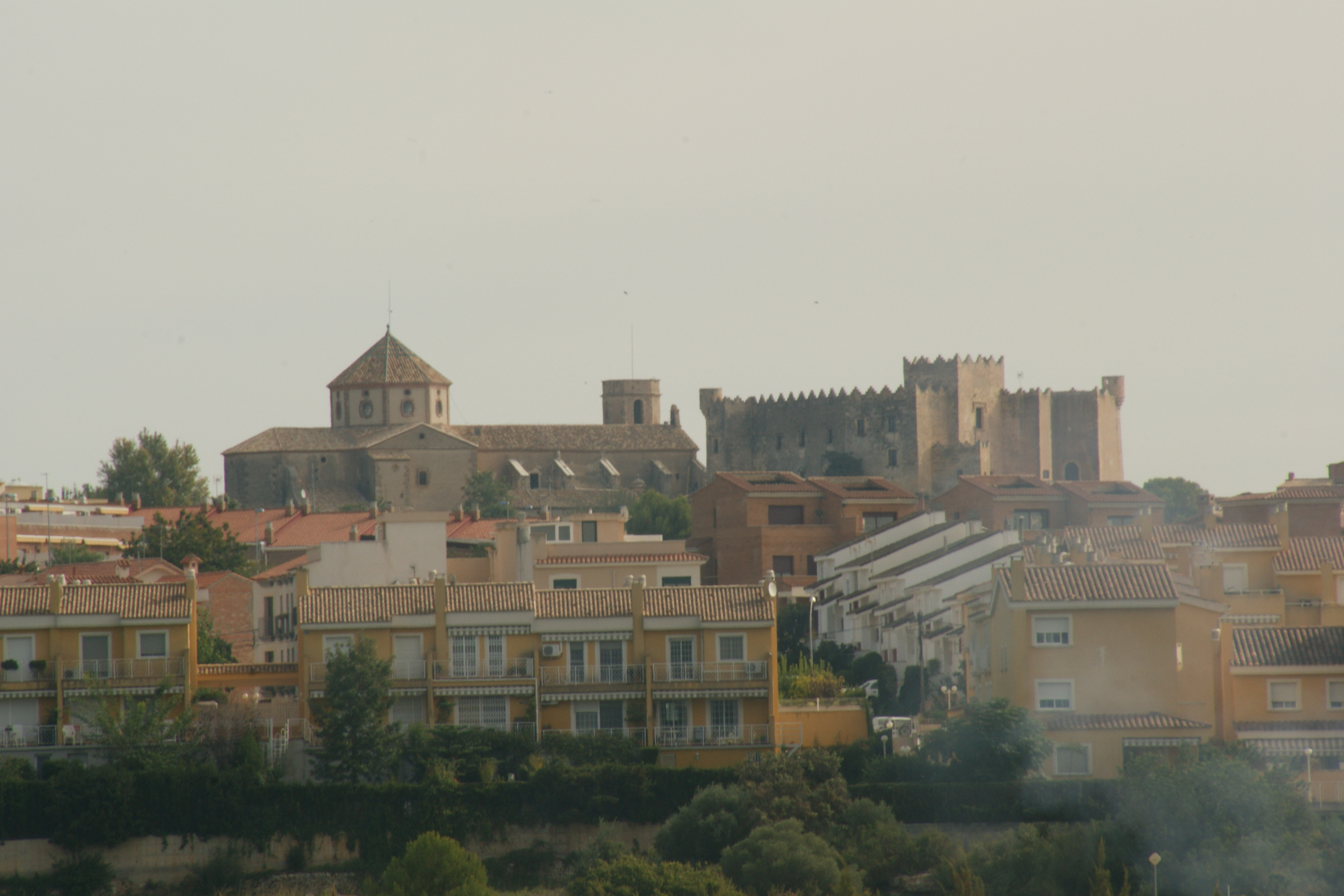
- Castle of Altafulla
Date	24 January 1812
Location	Altafulla, Spain 41°9′N 1°23′E
Result	French victory

Belligerents
(France) First French Empire	Kingdom of Spain

Commanders and leaders
(France) Maurice Mathieu	(Spain) Baron de Eroles

Units involved
(France) VII Corps	(Spain) Army of Catalonia

Strength
8,000	10,000

Casualties and losses
200	1,200

Peninsular War: Aragón Catalonia
current battle

At the Battle of Altafulla (24 January 1812), a Spanish division led by Joaquín Ibáñez Cuevas y de Valonga, Baron de Eroles clashed with an Imperial French division under the command of David-Maurice-Joseph Mathieu de La Redorte. Believing he faced only a single battalion, Eroles attacked in a heavy fog and was beaten by 8,000 French soldiers. The action occurred during the Peninsular War, part of the Napoleonic Wars. The battle was fought near Altafulla, 10 kilometres (6.2 mi) northeast of Tarragona, Catalonia, Spain.

Only a few days earlier, on 18 January 1812, Eroles' 4,250-man force had wiped out an 850-strong French battalion of the 121st Line Infantry Regiment at the Col de Balaguer, 11 kilometres (6.8 mi) southwest of Tarragona. Only the French commander, Jacques Mathurin Lafosse, and 22 dragoons escaped the debacle. Emboldened by his victory, Eroles decided to engage a French force six days later at Altafulla and suffered the loss of between 600 and 2,000 men. Uncowed by his defeat, Eroles repulsed Jean Raymond Charles Bourke's French force when it attacked him at Roda de Isábena on 5 March.

== Forces ==
Mathieu's Imperial forces included three battalions of the French 3rd Light Infantry Regiment, one battalion each of the French 18th Light, 23rd Line, and 115th Line Infantry Regiments, two battalions of the Duchy of Nassau Infantry Regiment, and two companies of partisans. Baron de Eroles led 4,000 foot soldiers, 250 cavalry, and two artillery pieces. Digby Smith asserted that Spanish losses came to 2,000 killed, wounded, and both guns, while the french losses were described as light. Charles Oman stated that Spanish losses amounted to 600 men and two guns.
