= David-Maurice-Joseph Mathieu de La Redorte =

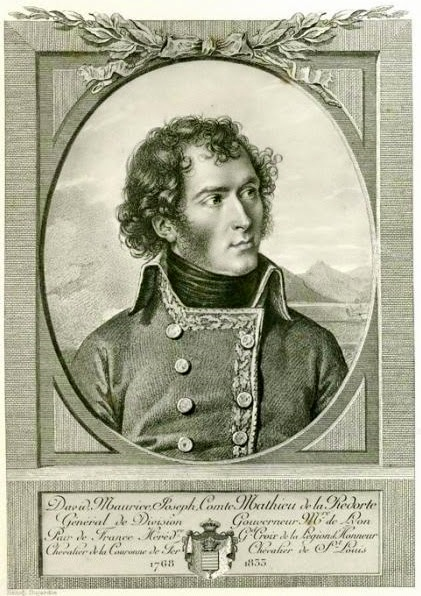
- General of Division David-Maurice-Joseph Mathieu de La Redorte
- Born: 20 February 1768; Saint-Affrique, Aveyron, France
- Died: 1 March 1833 (aged 65); Paris, France
- Military career
- Allegiance: France
- Branch: French Army
- Service years: 1783–1830
- Rank: General of Division
- Conflicts: French Revolutionary Wars; Battle of Valmy; Napoleonic Wars; Battle of Otricoli; Capitulation of Dornbirn; Battle of Tudela; Battle of Alba de Tormes; Battle of Fort Monjuich; Battle of Montserrat; Battle of Altafulla; Siege of Tarragona
- Awards: Légion d'Honneur, 1804; Order of the Iron Crown, 1807; Order of Saint Louis, 1814
- Other work: Count of the Empire, 1810; Peer of France, 1819

David-Maurice-Joseph Mathieu de Saint-Maurice de La Redorte or Maurice Mathieu (French pronunciation: [david mɔʁis ʒozɛf matjø də sɛ̃ mɔʁis də la ʁədɔʁt]; 20 February 1768 – 1 March 1833) was a French general during the Napoleonic Wars.

== Biography ==
Mathieu was born into a French noble family and entered the French Royal Army as an Officer cadet in 1783. During the French Revolution he became an aide de camp to General Jean-Antoine Chapsal and subsequently served in several armies of the French First Republic. He was appointed a general of brigade in 1798 and fought against the Kingdom of the Two Sicilies that year and the next. During the campaign he was badly wounded in the right arm, was promoted to general of division and had to leave the field.

In the 1805 campaign, Mathieu was named to command the 2nd Division of the VII Corps under Marshal Pierre Augereau. From 1806 to 1807 he served King Joseph Bonaparte in the puppet Napoleonic Kingdom of Naples. In 1808 he was appointed to command the 1st Division of the III Corps in Spain. He fought at Tudela in November. In 1809 he transferred to Marshal Michel Ney's VI Corps and was present at Alba de Tormes. From 1811 to 1813 he commanded a division in the Army of Catalonia, leading his troops at Fort Monjuich, Montserrat, Altafulla, and Tarragona.

Under King Louis XVIII he served as an inspector general. He switched allegiance to Napoleon during the Hundred Days but was soon restored to favor. In 1819 he became Count de La Redorte. After the July Revolution of 1830 he was sworn into the nobility but turned down an army post. He died in Paris in 1833.

Mce MATHIEU is one of the names inscribed under the Arc de Triomphe, on Column 36.
