= Jacques-Antoine-Adrien Delort =

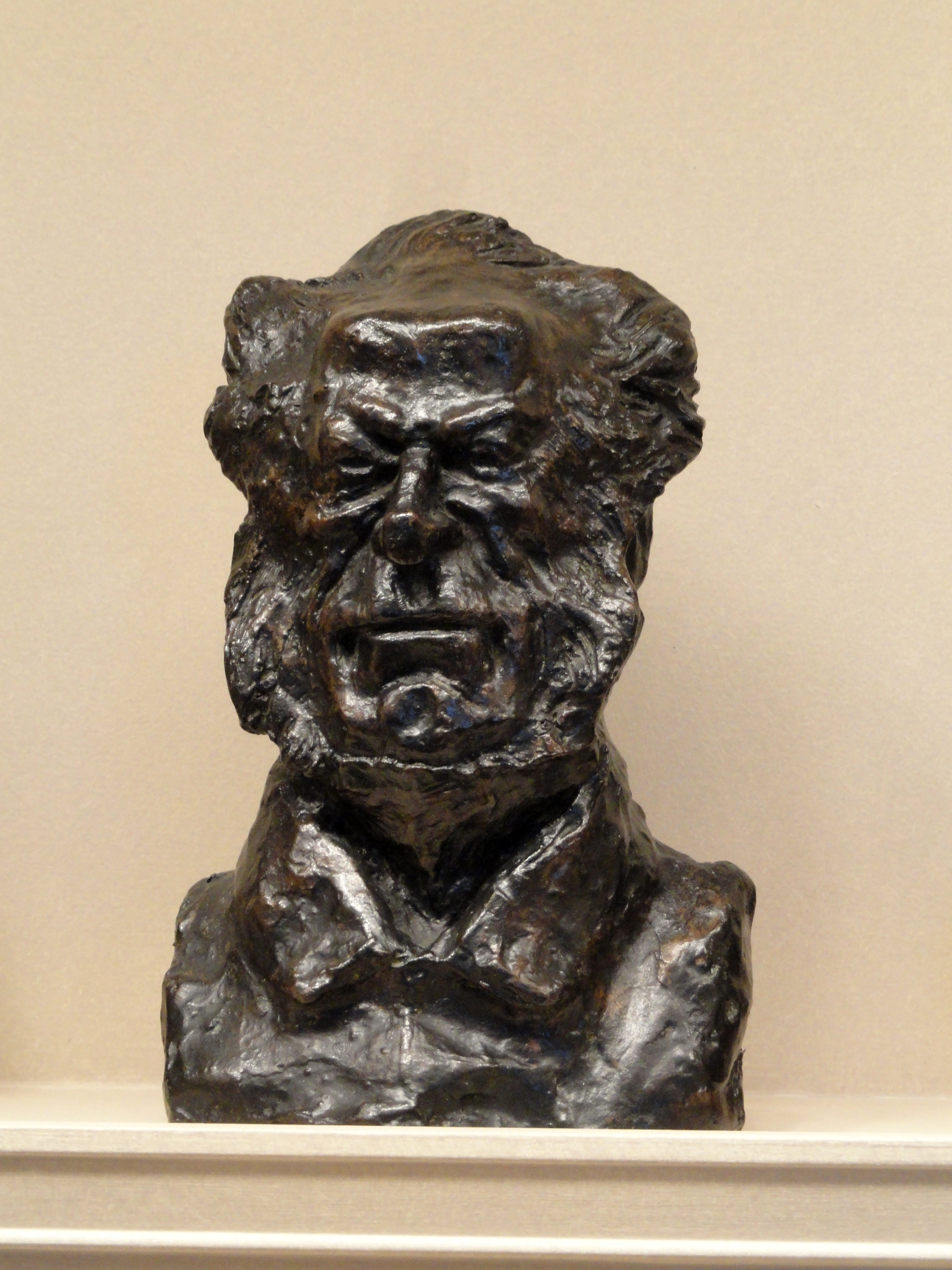
Bust of Jacques-Antoine-Adrien Delort by Honoré Daumier

Baron Jacques-Antoine-Adrien Delort (French: [ʒak ɑ̃twan adʁjɛ̃ dəlɔʁ]; 16 November 1773 – 28 March 1846) was a French general and deputy.

A National Guardsman at the age of 16 in 1789, he died a Lieutenant General, aide-de-camp to the King and a Peer of France. Major of the 9th Dragoon Regiment, his conduct at Austerlitz gave him command of the 24th Dragoons, at the head of which he covered himself with glory in Spain at Molins del Rey, Valls, Vic, and Saguntum. As a general of brigade in 1811, he held provisional command of the cavalry of the Army of Aragon through 1813. He beat Joseph O'Donnell at Castalla and charged the pass at Ordal. Recalled to France, Delort charged again at Montereau then, as a general of division, he commanded the 14th Division of Reserve Cavalry at Waterloo. DELORT is one of the names inscribed under the Arc de Triomphe on Column 36.
