= Jean Isidore Harispe =

French soldier

Marshal of France Jean Isidore Harispe 1st Count Harispe
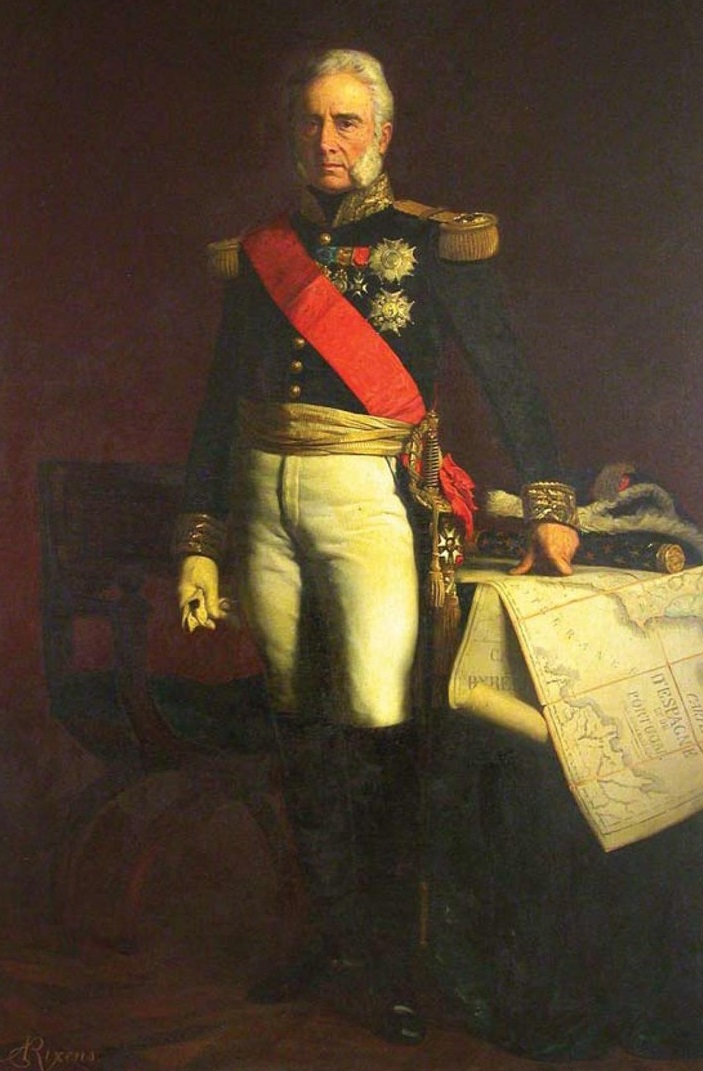
- Portrait of Maréchal Harispe, 19th century
- Born: 7 December 1768; Saint-Étienne-de-Baïgorry, France
- Died: 26 May 1855 (aged 86); Lacarre, France
- Military career
- Allegiance: First French Republic; First French Empire; Bourbon Restoration; July Monarchy; French Second Republic; Second French Empire
- Branch: French Army
- Service years: 1792–1855
- Rank: Maréchal de France
- Wars: War of the Pyrenees; War of the Third Coalition; War of the Fourth Coalition; Peninsular War; War of the Fifth Coalition; Hundred Days
- Awards: Legion of Honour (Grand Croix)

Jean Isidore Harispe, 1st Comte Harispe (French pronunciation: [ʒɑ̃ izidɔʁ aʁip]; 7 December 1768 – 26 May 1855) was a French soldier of the Revolutionary and Napoleonic Wars, as well as of the following period. Harispe was created a Marshal of France in 1851.

== Early life ==
Harispe was born in Saint-Étienne-de-Baïgorry the son of a wealthy Basque landowner who wanted his son to become a priest. When the French Revolutionary Wars started in 1792, Harispe enlisted as a volunteer in the French army. In 1793, Harispe was elected commanding officer of a company organizing at Saint-Jean-Pied-de-Port. Harispe distinguished himself in War of the Pyrenees against Spain. After peace was made with Spain in 1795, Harispe was assigned garrison duty in Bordeaux, where he fought insurgents in the Haute-Garonne. In 1799, he took part in the campaign in the Grisons under MacDonald. Transferred to the Army of Italy, he fought under Moncey and Brune. In May 1802, he was given command of the chasseurs basque, which became the 16th demi-brigade garrisoned in Angoulême.

== Napoleonic Wars ==
When the War of the Third Coalition broke out, Harispe served under Marshal Augereau in the Army of the Ocean Coast. In the campaigns of 1805 and 1806, he fought in the Division Desjardin. Harispe was wounded at Jena and in January 1807, he was promoted to general de brigade. Transferred to the corps of Marshal Soult, Harispe was given command of a brigade of the division Verdier. Harispe distinguished himself in fighting at Guttstadt and in the battles of Heilsberg and Friedland, where he was wounded again.

In December 1807, Harispe was made chief of staff of the Corps of Observation of the Ocean Coast under the orders of Marshal Moncey. With this corps, he partook in the Spanish campaign of 1808. In November 1808, Harispe fought under Marshal Lannes at the Battle of Tudela and in the siege of Zaragoza. After Lannes returned to France on the outbreak of the War of the Fifth Coalition, Harispe became chief of staff to general Suchet.

After being wounded in the Battle of María, where Suchet with 10,000 men beat a larger Spanish force, Harispe was promoted to general of division. From 1810 to 1812, he distinguished himself further in the sieges of Lérida, Tarragona and Valencia. He defeated an army twice the size of his own force in the First Battle of Castalla on 21 July 1812. Harispe was made a Grand Officer in the Legion of Honour and created a Count of the Empire.

Harispe served in the Army of Aragon until 1813. In 1814, he was sent to Barcelona to serve as reinforcements to Soult, who after Vitoria was tasked with preventing the Duke of Wellington from invading southern France. During the retreat into France, he was forced to burn his own castle in his native town to prevent it being used by the Spanish. After the Battle of Orthez, he covered the retreat of the army. After having fought a Portuguese division at Tarbes on 20 March 1814, Harispe served in the Battle of Toulouse, fought after Napoléon had already abdicated. Tasked with defending the heights at Calvinet, he defended these redoubts to the utmost. His leg had to be amputated after it was shattered by a cannonball.

== Later life ==
During the Bourbon Restoration, Harispe was made a knight of Saint Louis and given command of the 15th military division. Upon Napoléon's return from Elba, Harispe rallied to the emperor during the Hundred Days and served on the Spanish border. After the second abdication, Harispe tried to prevent the Spanish invading southern France. The Second Bourbon Restoration caused Harispe to retire to his chateau until the 1830 Revolution. During this revolution, Harispe was elected a deputy. As a supporter of the July Monarchy, he was recalled to active duty and given command of the Hautes and Basses-Pyrénées (1830–1833), of the division of the Pyrénées occidentales (1833–1840) and of the 20th military division (1840–1850).

Harispe served as a deputy for the Basses-Pyrénées (1831–1835) and was made Grand Cross in the Légion d'honneur. Having been made a Peer of France in 1835, he was created a Marshal of France by President Bonaparte. After the establishment of the Second French Empire he was made a senator. Harispe died in 1855 in Lacarre.

Harispe has his name inscribed on the west side of the Arc de Triomphe.
