= Joseph O'Donnell y O'Donnell =

Irish-born army officer in the service of Spain (1722–1787)

Joseph (José) O'Donnell
- Born: 20 December 1722; Aughaval (now Westport), Ireland
- Died: 22 March 1787 (aged 64–65)
- Allegiance: Spain
- Conflicts

Joseph O'Donnell or José O'Donnell y Donnell (20 December 1722 – 22 March 1787) was an Irish-Spanish general and Colonel of Spain's Irlanda Regiment. His six sons fought during the Peninsular War; three became Spanish generals.

== Biography ==
Born in Ireland, to Charles O'Donnell and Mary O'Donnell, Joseph O'Donnell went to Spain in 1739, when he was sixteen years old and enlisted as a cadet in the 2nd Battalion of the Irlanda Regiment in 1739. Two distant relatives of his had come to Spain earlier; Lieutenant-colonel John O'Donnell, who died in 1740, and Carlos O'Donnell, who had enlisted as a cadet in the Irlanda Regiment in 1734 and would later also become a lieutenant-colonel of that regiment.

=== Career ===
Promoted to captain in 1758, Joseph O'Donnell went on to study at the Royal Military and Mathematics Academy of Barcelona. In 1768, he was appointed sargento mayor of his regiment, lieutenant colonel in 1773 and, in 1777, he was appointed colonel of the Irlanda Regiment.

== Family ==
O'Donnell married María Ana de Anhetan, in Luxembourg in 1765. The couple had two daughters and six sons. All six sons fought during the Peninsular War, the eldest and the youngest dying before it was over and three of them became Spanish generals:

- Leopoldo O'Donnell y Anhetan (died 1811): Killed at the Siege of Figueras (1811)
- Alejandro O'Donnell (born in Luxembourg, c. 1763 – La Coruña, 1 December 1837) As commander of the 3rd Battalion of the Hibernia Regiment, O'Donnell was captured at the Battle of Coruña and taken prisoner to France.
- Joseph O'Donnell (1768–1836): following his part in the successful evacuation of the La Romana Division from Denmark in 1808, he suffered a series of defeats, being beaten by Nicolas Godinot at Zújar in 1811, and routed by Jean Isidore Harispe at Castalla in 1812.
- Charles O'Donnell (1772–1830) helped defend the Lines of Torres Vedras in 1810 and was named Captain General of Valencia in 1811.
- Henry O'Donnell, 1st Count of la Bisbal (1776–1834), the most famous of the three, was defeated at Vic by Joseph Souham, beaten badly at Margalef by forces under Louis Gabriel Suchet, won a victory at the La Bisbal in 1810 over François Xavier de Schwarz, and successfully concluded the Siege of Pamplona in 1813.
- Francisco O'Donnell (born La Coruña – died in France as a prisoner of war): enlisted as a child cadet in the Hibernia Regiment, by 1805 he was a lieutenant in the sister regiment of Irlanda at Cádiz.

O'Donnell enlisted his three eldest sons, Leopoldo, José and Carlos, in his own regiment, and the three youngest, Henry, Alejandro and Francisco, in one of its sister regiments, the Hibernia.
