= Battle of Saguntum and Siege of Valencia orders of battle =

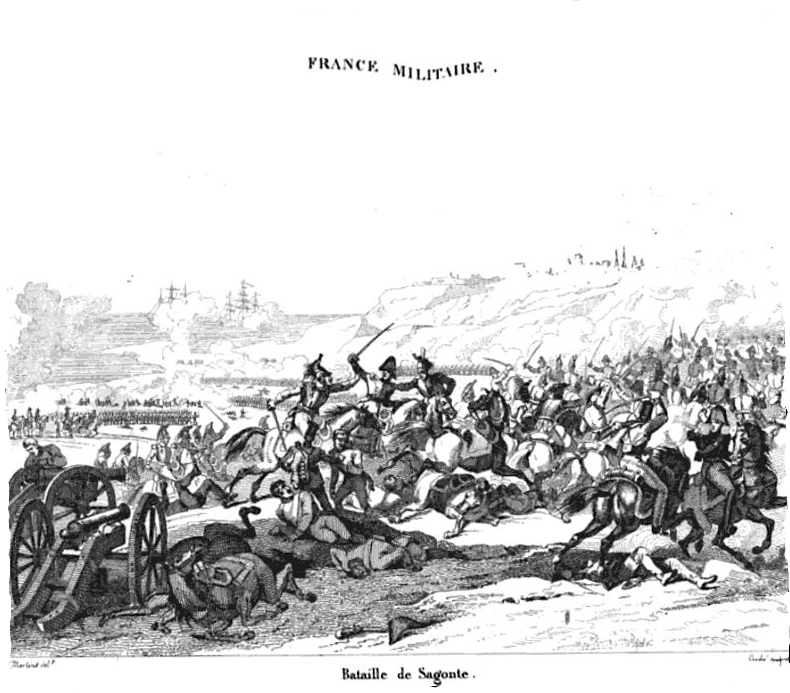
Battle of Saguntum

The Battle of Saguntum (25 October 1811) saw the Imperial French Army of Aragon under Marshal Louis Gabriel Suchet defend against a Spanish army led by Captain General Joaquín Blake. The Spanish attempt to raise the siege of the Sagunto Castle failed when the French, Italians, and Poles drove their troops off the battlefield in rout. The 20,000 French inflicted 6,000 casualties on their more numerous opponents, including many prisoners, while sustaining only about 1,000 casualties.

Suchet hoped to quickly seize Sagunto Castle, but the 2,600-man Spanish garrison repulsed two of his assaults with several hundred casualties. Blake hoped to force Suchet to retreat by cutting off his supplies. The guerillas inflicted two stinging defeats on the French-Allied forces, but ultimately failed to shake Suchet's resolve. Blake reluctantly ordered his army to relieve the siege, even though he was not confident in the ability of his soldiers to face Suchet's veterans. Blake heavily weighted his left wing while keeping his best troops in the weaker right wing. The Spanish left wing attacked the much weaker French right flank and was completely routed by French infantry and Italian cavalry. The Spanish right wing gave a much better account of itself, forcing Suchet to commit all his reserves before forcing it to withdraw. Eventually, the French cavalry put the whole Spanish army to rout. Their hopes of relief dashed, the garrison of Sagunto Castle quickly surrendered. The action took place during the Peninsular War, part of the Napoleonic Wars. Sagunto lies a short distance from the east coast of Spain, about 30 kilometres (19 mi) north of Valencia, Spain.

The Siege of Valencia (3 November 1811 – 9 January 1812) saw Suchet's army envelop and besiege most of Blake's army in the city of Valencia. The 30,000 French troops compelled 16,000 Spanish soldiers to surrender at the conclusion of the siege, although another 7,000 Spaniards escaped from the trap. Suchet quickly converted Valencia into an important base of operations. Valencia, modern-day capital of the Valencian Community, is located on the east coast of Spain.

Blake army waited passively in a line of fortifications outside Valencia. Reinforced by 13,000 Franco-Italian troops, the bulk of Suchet's army marched around the Spanish left flank and rolled up Blake's lines. Another Imperial French division managed to break through the Spanish right flank. The right and left Imperial pincers closed around Valencia. Two-thirds of Blake's army retreated within the city while the remainder withdrew to the west. After an abortive attempt to break out, Blake surrendered after a two-month siege.

== Orders of Battle ==
=== French-Allied Army ===
Marshal Louis Gabriel Suchet's Imperial French Army at Saguntum and Valencia
Division	Strength at Saguntum	Strength at Valencia	Brigade	Units	Strength at Saguntum
1st Division; General of Division; Louis François Félix Musnier	4,829	3,727	General of Brigade; Louis Benoît Robert	(France) 114th Line Infantry Regiment, three battalions	1,637
1st Division; General of Division; Louis François Félix Musnier	4,829	3,727	General of Brigade; Louis Benoît Robert	(Poland) 1st Legion of the Vistula, two battalions	863
1st Division; General of Division; Louis François Félix Musnier	4,829	3,727	General of Brigade Florentin Ficatier; Guarding line of communications (LOC)	(France) 121st Line Infantry Regiment, three battalions	1,200
1st Division; General of Division; Louis François Félix Musnier	4,829	3,727	General of Brigade Florentin Ficatier; Guarding line of communications (LOC)	(Poland) 2nd Legion of the Vistula, two battalions	1,129
2nd Division; General of Division; Jean Isidore Harispe	4,762	4,828	General of Brigade; Marie Auguste Paris	(France) 7th Line Infantry Regiment, four battalions	1,639
2nd Division; General of Division; Jean Isidore Harispe	4,762	4,828	General of Brigade; Marie Auguste Paris	(France) 116th Line Infantry Regiment, three battalions	1,147
2nd Division; General of Division; Jean Isidore Harispe	4,762	4,828	General of Brigade; Józef Chłopicki	(France) 44th Line Infantry Regiment, two battalions	1,226
2nd Division; General of Division; Jean Isidore Harispe	4,762	4,828	General of Brigade; Józef Chłopicki	(Poland) 3rd Legion of the Vistula, two battalions	750
3rd Division; General of Division; Pierre-Joseph Habert	3,459	3,150	General of Brigade; Louis François Élie Pelletier, Count Montmarie	(France) 5th Line Infantry Regiment, two battalions	802
3rd Division; General of Division; Pierre-Joseph Habert	3,459	3,150	General of Brigade; Louis François Élie Pelletier, Count Montmarie	(France) 16th Line Infantry Regiment, three battalions	1,317
3rd Division; General of Division; Pierre-Joseph Habert	3,459	3,150	General of Brigade; Nicolas Bronikowski	(France) 117th Line Infantry Regiment, two battalions	1,340
Italian Division; General of Division; Giuseppe Federico Palombini; Three battalions guarding LOC	6,219	3,591	General of Brigade; Vertigier Saint Paul	(Kingdom of Italy (Napoleonic)) 2nd Light Infantry Regiment, three battalions	2,200
Italian Division; General of Division; Giuseppe Federico Palombini; Three battalions guarding LOC	6,219	3,591	General of Brigade; Vertigier Saint Paul	(Kingdom of Italy (Napoleonic)) 4th Line Infantry Regiment, three battalions	1,660
Italian Division; General of Division; Giuseppe Federico Palombini; Three battalions guarding LOC	6,219	3,591	General of Brigade; Éloi Charles Balathier	(Kingdom of Italy (Napoleonic)) 5th Line Infantry Regiment, two battalions	930
Italian Division; General of Division; Giuseppe Federico Palombini; Three battalions guarding LOC	6,219	3,591	General of Brigade; Éloi Charles Balathier	(Kingdom of Italy (Napoleonic)) 6th Line Infantry Regiment, three battalions	1,429
Neapolitan Division; General of Division; Claude Antoine Compère	1,391	1,092	unbrigaded	(Kingdom of Naples) 1st Light Infantry Regiment, one battalion	446
Neapolitan Division; General of Division; Claude Antoine Compère	1,391	1,092	unbrigaded	(Kingdom of Naples) 1st Line Infantry Regiment, one battalion	560
Neapolitan Division; General of Division; Claude Antoine Compère	1,391	1,092	unbrigaded	(Kingdom of Naples) 2nd Line Infantry Regiment, one battalion	385
Cavalry; General of Brigade; André Joseph Boussart	2,405	1,839	unbrigaded Two squadrons (500) of 4th Hussars guarding LOC	(France) 4th Hussar Regiment, four squadrons	750
Cavalry; General of Brigade; André Joseph Boussart	2,405	1,839	unbrigaded Two squadrons (500) of 4th Hussars guarding LOC	(France) 24th Dragoon Regiment, two squadrons	436
Cavalry; General of Brigade; André Joseph Boussart	2,405	1,839	unbrigaded Two squadrons (500) of 4th Hussars guarding LOC	(France) 13th Cuirassier Regiment, four squadrons	584
Cavalry; General of Brigade; André Joseph Boussart	2,405	1,839	unbrigaded Two squadrons (500) of 4th Hussars guarding LOC	(Kingdom of Italy (Napoleonic)) Napoleone Dragoon Regiment	466
Cavalry; General of Brigade; André Joseph Boussart	2,405	1,839	unbrigaded Two squadrons (500) of 4th Hussars guarding LOC	(Kingdom of Naples) 2nd Chasseur Regiment	169
Artillery & Engineers	3,068	2,368	General of Division; Sylvain Charles Valée	(France) (Kingdom of Italy (Napoleonic)) (Poland) Artillery	1,805
Artillery & Engineers	3,068	2,368	General of Division; Joseph Rogniat	(France) Engineers	600
Artillery & Engineers	3,068	2,368	unknown	(France) Military Equipment, Gendarmes	663
Grand Total	26,133	20,595	–	–	26,133
Division Reille; General of Division; Honoré Charles Reille	–	2,834	General of Brigade; Claude Marie Joseph Pannetier	(France) 10th Line Infantry Regiment	–
Division Reille; General of Division; Honoré Charles Reille	–	2,834	General of Brigade; Claude Marie Joseph Pannetier	(France) 81st Line Infantry Regiment	–
Division Reille; General of Division; Honoré Charles Reille	–	3,961	General of Brigade; Jean Raymond Charles Bourke	(France) 20th Line Infantry Regiment	–
Division Reille; General of Division; Honoré Charles Reille	–	3,961	General of Brigade; Jean Raymond Charles Bourke	(France) 60th Line Infantry Regiment	–
Division Severoli; General of Division; Filippo Severoli	–	4,370	unbrigaded	(Kingdom of Italy (Napoleonic)) 1st Light Infantry Regiment, three battalions	–
Division Severoli; General of Division; Filippo Severoli	–	4,370	unbrigaded	(Kingdom of Italy (Napoleonic)) 1st Line Infantry Regiment, three battalions	–
Division Severoli; General of Division; Filippo Severoli	–	4,370	unbrigaded	(Kingdom of Italy (Napoleonic)) 7th Line Infantry Regiment, two battalions	–
Cavalry Reille's Corps	–	543	unbrigaded	(France) 9th Hussar Regiment	–
Cavalry Reille's Corps	–	262	unbrigaded	(Kingdom of Italy (Napoleonic)) 1st Chasseur Regiment	–
Artillery Reille's Corps	–	1,153	unbrigaded	(France) (Kingdom of Italy (Napoleonic)) Artillery, etc.	–
Total Reille's Corps	–	13,123	–	–	–

=== Spanish Army ===
General Joaquín Blake's Spanish Army at Saguntum and Valencia
Corps	Division	Strength at Saguntum	Surrendered at Valencia	Units
Expeditionary; Corps	Division; General; José de Lardizábal	2,972	3,550	Murcia Infantry Regiment, two battalions
Expeditionary; Corps	Division; General; José de Lardizábal	2,972	3,550	2nd Badajoz Infantry Regiment, two battalions
Expeditionary; Corps	Division; General; José de Lardizábal	2,972	3,550	Campo Mayor Light Infantry Regiment, one battalion
Expeditionary; Corps	Division; General; José de Lardizábal	2,972	3,550	Tiradores de Cuenca Battalion
Expeditionary; Corps	Division; General; José Pascual de Zayas y Chacón	2,550	1,415	2nd Spanish Guards Infantry Regiment, one battalion
Expeditionary; Corps	Division; General; José Pascual de Zayas y Chacón	2,550	1,415	4th Spanish Guards Infantry Regiment, one battalion
Expeditionary; Corps	Division; General; José Pascual de Zayas y Chacón	2,550	1,415	Walloon Guards Infantry Regiment, one battalion
Expeditionary; Corps	Division; General; José Pascual de Zayas y Chacón	2,550	1,415	Toledo Infantry Regiment, one battalion
Expeditionary; Corps	Division; General; José Pascual de Zayas y Chacón	2,550	1,415	Ciudad Rodrigo Infantry Regiment, one battalion
Expeditionary; Corps	Division; General; José Pascual de Zayas y Chacón	2,550	1,415	Voluntaros de la Patria Regiment, one battalion
Expeditionary; Corps	Division; General; José Pascual de Zayas y Chacón	2,550	1,415	Legion Estrangera Regiment, one battalion
Expeditionary; Corps	Division; General; José Pascual de Zayas y Chacón	2,550	1,415	Independent Cazadores companies
Expeditionary; Corps	Cavalry; General Loy	294	–	Horse Grenadier Regiment, two squadrons
Expeditionary; Corps	Cavalry; General Loy	294	–	Rey (King's) Regiment, one squadron
Expeditionary; Corps	Cavalry; General Loy	294	–	Castilla Hussar Regiment, one squadron
Expeditionary; Corps	Artillery	225	–	Horse Artillery, two batteries
Valencian Corps; 2nd Army; Lieutenant General; Charles O'Donnell	Division; General; José Miranda	3,964	5,750	Valencia Infantry Regiment, three battalions
Valencian Corps; 2nd Army; Lieutenant General; Charles O'Donnell	Division; General; José Miranda	3,964	5,750	Avila Infantry Regiment, 1st Battalion
Valencian Corps; 2nd Army; Lieutenant General; Charles O'Donnell	Division; General; José Miranda	3,964	5,750	Volunteers of Castile Regiment, two battalions
Valencian Corps; 2nd Army; Lieutenant General; Charles O'Donnell	Division; General; José Miranda	3,964	5,750	Cazadores of Valencia Regiment, 2nd Battalion
Valencian Corps; 2nd Army; Lieutenant General; Charles O'Donnell	Division; General; José Obispo	3,400	–	Carineña Infantry Regiment, two battalions
Valencian Corps; 2nd Army; Lieutenant General; Charles O'Donnell	Division; General; José Obispo	3,400	–	Avila Infantry Regiment, 2nd Battalion
Valencian Corps; 2nd Army; Lieutenant General; Charles O'Donnell	Division; General; José Obispo	3,400	–	Daroca Infantry Regiment, one battalion
Valencian Corps; 2nd Army; Lieutenant General; Charles O'Donnell	Division; General; José Obispo	3,400	–	Volunteers of Aragon Regiment, 1st Battalion
Valencian Corps; 2nd Army; Lieutenant General; Charles O'Donnell	Division; General; José Obispo	3,400	–	Tiradores of Doyle Regiment, one battalion
Valencian Corps; 2nd Army; Lieutenant General; Charles O'Donnell	Division; General; Pedro Villacampa	3,352	–	Princesa Infantry Regiment, two battalions
Valencian Corps; 2nd Army; Lieutenant General; Charles O'Donnell	Division; General; Pedro Villacampa	3,352	–	Soria Infantry Regiment, two battalions
Valencian Corps; 2nd Army; Lieutenant General; Charles O'Donnell	Division; General; Pedro Villacampa	3,352	–	Molina Infantry Regiment, one battalion
Valencian Corps; 2nd Army; Lieutenant General; Charles O'Donnell	Division; General; Pedro Villacampa	3,352	–	Volunteers of Aragon Regiment, 2nd Battalion
Valencian Corps; 2nd Army; Lieutenant General; Charles O'Donnell	Division; General; Pedro Villacampa	3,352	–	Cazadores of Valencia Regiment, 1st Battalion
Valencian Corps; 2nd Army; Lieutenant General; Charles O'Donnell	Reserve; General Velasco	3,670	3,301	Volunteers of Castile Regiment, 3rd Battalion
Valencian Corps; 2nd Army; Lieutenant General; Charles O'Donnell	Reserve; General Velasco	3,670	3,301	Avila Infantry Regiment, 3rd Battalion
Valencian Corps; 2nd Army; Lieutenant General; Charles O'Donnell	Reserve; General Velasco	3,670	3,301	Don Carlos Infantry Regiment, 3rd Battalion
Valencian Corps; 2nd Army; Lieutenant General; Charles O'Donnell	Reserve; General Velasco	3,670	3,301	Cazadores of Valencia Regiment, 3rd Battalion
Valencian Corps; 2nd Army; Lieutenant General; Charles O'Donnell	Cavalry; General San Juan	1,721	895	Alcantara Cavalry Regiment
Valencian Corps; 2nd Army; Lieutenant General; Charles O'Donnell	Cavalry; General San Juan	1,721	895	Reina (Queen's) Cavalry Regiment
Valencian Corps; 2nd Army; Lieutenant General; Charles O'Donnell	Cavalry; General San Juan	1,721	895	Rey (King's) Dragoon Regiment
Valencian Corps; 2nd Army; Lieutenant General; Charles O'Donnell	Cavalry; General San Juan	1,721	895	Valencia Cazadores Regiment
Valencian Corps; 2nd Army; Lieutenant General; Charles O'Donnell	Cavalry; General San Juan	1,721	895	Aragon Hussar Regiment
Valencian Corps; 2nd Army; Lieutenant General; Charles O'Donnell	Cavalry; General San Juan	1,721	895	Españoles Hussar Regiment
Valencian Corps; 2nd Army; Lieutenant General; Charles O'Donnell	Cavalry; General San Juan	1,721	895	Grenada Hussar Regiment
Valencian Corps; 2nd Army; Lieutenant General; Charles O'Donnell	Cavalry; General San Juan	1,721	895	Numancia Hussar Regiment
Valencian Corps; 2nd Army; Lieutenant General; Charles O'Donnell	Cavalry; General San Juan	1,721	895	Cuenca Cavalry Regiment
Valencian Corps; 2nd Army; Lieutenant General; Charles O'Donnell	Artillery	361	–	Horse Artillery, one battery
Valencian Corps; 2nd Army; Lieutenant General; Charles O'Donnell	Artillery	361	–	Foot Artillery, two batteries
Murcian Corps; 3rd Army; Lieutenant General; Nicolás Mahy	Brigade; General; Juan Creagh	2,218	–	Corona Infantry Regiment, one battalion
Murcian Corps; 3rd Army; Lieutenant General; Nicolás Mahy	Brigade; General; Juan Creagh	2,218	–	Alcazar Infantry Regiment, one battalion
Murcian Corps; 3rd Army; Lieutenant General; Nicolás Mahy	Brigade; General; Juan Creagh	2,218	–	Tiradores of Cádiz Regiment, one battalion
Murcian Corps; 3rd Army; Lieutenant General; Nicolás Mahy	Brigade; General; Eugenio Palafox, Conde de Montijo	2,410	–	1st Badajoz Infantry Regiment, one battalion
Murcian Corps; 3rd Army; Lieutenant General; Nicolás Mahy	Brigade; General; Eugenio Palafox, Conde de Montijo	2,410	–	1st Cuenca Infantry Regiment, one battalion
Murcian Corps; 3rd Army; Lieutenant General; Nicolás Mahy	Brigade; General; Eugenio Palafox, Conde de Montijo	2,410	–	Volunteers of Burgos Regiment, one battalion
Murcian Corps; 3rd Army; Lieutenant General; Nicolás Mahy	Brigade; General; Eugenio Palafox, Conde de Montijo	2,410	–	Sapper Battalion
Murcian Corps; 3rd Army; Lieutenant General; Nicolás Mahy	Cavalry	826	–	Reina (Queen's) Cavalry Regiment, two squadrons
Murcian Corps; 3rd Army; Lieutenant General; Nicolás Mahy	Cavalry	826	–	Pavia Cavalry Regiment, two squadrons
Murcian Corps; 3rd Army; Lieutenant General; Nicolás Mahy	Cavalry	826	–	Granada Cavalry Regiment, two squadrons
Murcian Corps; 3rd Army; Lieutenant General; Nicolás Mahy	Cavalry	826	–	Madrid Cavalry Regiment, one squadron
Murcian Corps; 3rd Army; Lieutenant General; Nicolás Mahy	Cavalry	826	–	Ferdinand VII Hussar Regiment, one squadron
Murcian Corps; 3rd Army; Lieutenant General; Nicolás Mahy	Artillery	81	–	Horse Artillery, one battery
Valencia Garrison	Artillery	–	1,654	Artillery
Valencia Garrison	Sappers	–	421	Engineers and sappers
Grand Totals	–	28,044	16,986	–
Saguntum Garrison	Brigade; Colonel Luis Andriani	2,663	–	Savoya Infantry Regiment, 2nd and 3rd Battalions
Saguntum Garrison	Brigade; Colonel Luis Andriani	2,663	–	Don Carlos Infantry Regiment, 1st and 2nd Battalions
Saguntum Garrison	Brigade; Colonel Luis Andriani	2,663	–	Volunteers of Orihuela Regiment, 3rd Battalion
Saguntum Garrison	Brigade; Colonel Luis Andriani	2,663	–	150 Gunners and Sappers, 17 guns
