= Fernando de Cagigal =

Spanish soldier, poet, and playwright (1756–1824)

- Born: Fernando de Cagigal de la Vega y Martínez Niño; 7 April 1756; Pasajes (Guipúzcoa), Spain
- Died: 25 October 1824 1824 (aged 67–68) Barcelona,
- Allegiance: Spain
- Conflicts: American Revolutionary War; Invasion of Minorca (1781); War of the Pyrenees; First Battle of Sant Llorenç de la Muga; Battle of Bascara

Fernando de Cagigal de la Vega y Martínez Niño, 4th Marquis of Casa Cagigal (1756–1824) was a Spanish soldier, poet, and playwright.

== Family and origins ==
Fernando de Cagigal was born into a family with a long history of military service, so much so that they were well-known in military circles as "The Cagigals".

His father, Felipe Cagigal de la Vega y Niño, 3rd Marquis of Casa Cagigal, was Captain general of Extremadura and a member of the War Council and his mother was Teresa Mac Swing y Pacheco. (Note: Her surname Mac Swing also appears as Mac Suini, Manzini, or Orcusini, depending on the sources, and it seems that their three sons opted for Castilianizing it to Martínez (See Andújar). The Spanish historian Hugo O'Donnell (2017) states that MacSwiny is the most common form used.)

His two younger brothers, Juan Manuel de Cagigal (1757–1823) and José de Cagigal (1757–1837), both had notable military careers.

== Career ==
Cagigal was commissioned as a captain, an entry rank reserved for members of families with a proven aristocratic or military lineage, in the "Spain" Cavalry Regiment, eventually becoming its commanding officer before being transferred to the Queen's Regiment and promoted to lieutenant colonel in 1782. He first saw action at Mahón in 1782, before participating at blockading Gibraltar between December 1787 to May 1790, when he was sent to join Spain's Rousillon Army.

At the start of the War of the Pyrenees he was promoted to colonel and transferred to the Algarbe Cavalry Regiment in 1793, later that year being promoted to brigadier, seeing action on several occasions that year, including at the First Battle of Sant Llorenç de la Muga, serving under the orders of both Francisco Solano and general Antonio Cornel.

In June 1794, General Ricardos gave him the command of the Cavalry at Millas, in Arrondissement of Perpignan, where Cagigal distinguished himself during the French attack on the village and five days later, at the head of 500 grenadiers and 120 horse he again fought off a French attack there.

At the beginning of 1798, Cagigal was sent to the Canary Islands with the Ultonia and América regiments to relieve the troops that had fought at the Battle of Santa Cruz de Tenerife the previous year. Later that year he was appointed second-in-command to José Perlasco, the captain-general of the Canary Islands, the post Cagigal himself would later take on.

=== Peninsular War ===
At the start of the war, Cagigal was accused of being an afrancesado and deposed as captain general of the Canary Islands in a plot led by his second-in-command, Carlos O'Donnell, (Note: Several of the co-conspirators were, like Cagigal himself, of Irish origins (O'Donnell, 2017), including O'Donnell's second-in-command, Juan José Creagh, and José Murphy Meade, a leading businessman and politician.) Cagigal was arrested and sent for trial to Cádiz, where he was eventually acquitted in 1810, thanks, in part, to the personal intervention of General Francisco Javier Castaños.
