= Joseph O'Donnell y Anhetan =

Irish-Spanish army officer (1768–1836)

Joseph (José) O'Donnell y Anhetan
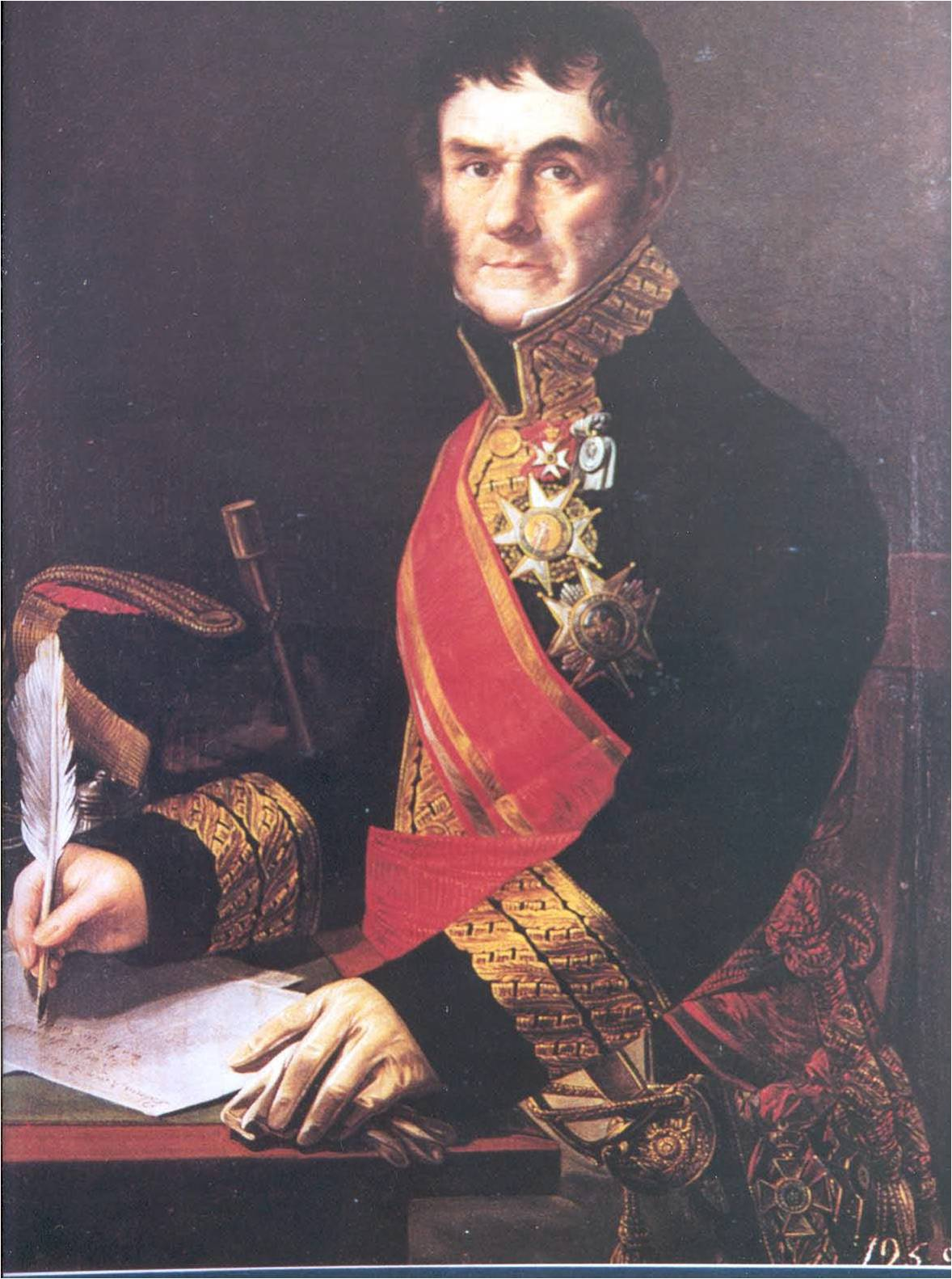
- José O'Donnell y Anethan around 1819
- Born: 28 August 1768; Guadalajara, Spain
- Died: 30 November 1836 (aged 68); Madrid
- Military career
- Allegiance: Kingdom of Spain
- Branch: Infantry
- Rank: Captain General
- Conflicts: Peninsular War; La Romana's Escape; Battle of Zújar; Battle of Castalla
- Awards: Order of San Fernando

Joseph O'Donnell D'Anhetan or José O'Donnell y Anhetan (1768–1836) was an Irish-Spanish general who commanded troops from the Kingdom of Spain against Imperial France during the Peninsular War.

== Biography ==
His father was Joseph O'Donnell O'Donnell and his mother was María Ana de Anhetan.

Joseph O'Donnell D'Anhetan was the brother of two other generals who also fought during the Peninsular War, Henry O'Donnell, 1st Count of la Bisbal and Carlos O'Donnell as did his three other brothers, Leopoldo and Francisco, both of whom were killed during the war, and Alejandro.

=== Early career ===
His father having enlisted him as a child cadet in the Irlanda Regiment in 1777, he was forced to abandoned his studies at the Royal Military and Mathematics Academy of Barcelona when his regiment, garrisoned at Ceuta, came under siege in 1790.

=== Peninsular War ===
In 1808, O'Donnell was second-in-command to Pedro Caro, 3rd Marquis of la Romana during the escape of the Northern Division from Denmark. Promoted to colonel at the end of that year, O'Donnell was given command of the Princesa Regiment, remaining with La Romana throughout the May 1809 campaign in Asturias. His younger brother, Carlos O'Donnell, would later serve under La Romana.

In 1809, O'Donnell led the 698-strong Cavalry Brigade, made up of four squadrons of the Olivenza Regiment and one squadron of the Santiago Regiment of General Blake's Army of Aragon at the Battle of María.

He was beaten by Nicolas Godinot at Zújar in 1811. After the loss of Valencia in January 1812, he ably reorganized the fragments of the Spanish army.

While Captain General of Murcia, he suffered a severe defeat at the hands of Jean Isidore Harispe at Castalla in July 1812, a defeat that led to his brother Enrique O'Donnell having to resign from the Regency Council at Cádiz and he, himself, requesting an inquiry into the defeat. In the meantime, the following month he was commissioned to organise the Reserve Army and was finally fully exonerated of any fault for the defeat at Castalla.

=== Post-war career ===
He was promoted to lieutenant general in 1815.

== Bibliography ==
- Gates, David (2002). The Spanish Ulcer: A History of the Peninsular War. London: Pimlico. ISBN 0-7126-9730-6.
- Oman, Charles (1996). A History of the Peninsular War Volume IV. Mechanicsburg, Pennsylvania: Stackpole. ISBN 1-85367-224-6.
- Oman, Charles (1914). A History of the Peninsular War Volume V. Oxford: Clarendon Press.
- Smith, Digby (1998). The Napoleonic Wars Data Book. London: Greenhill. ISBN 1-85367-276-9.
- "Real y Militar Orden de San Fernando 200 Años: Familia de Héroes" (PDF) (in Spanish).
