= Zújar, Spain =

Zújar, Spain may refer to:

- Zújar municipality in Granada Province
- Zújar River, a tributary of the Guadiana flowing through Cordoba Province and Extremadura
