= Irlanda Regiment (Spain) =

Spanish army regiment (18th–19th centuries)

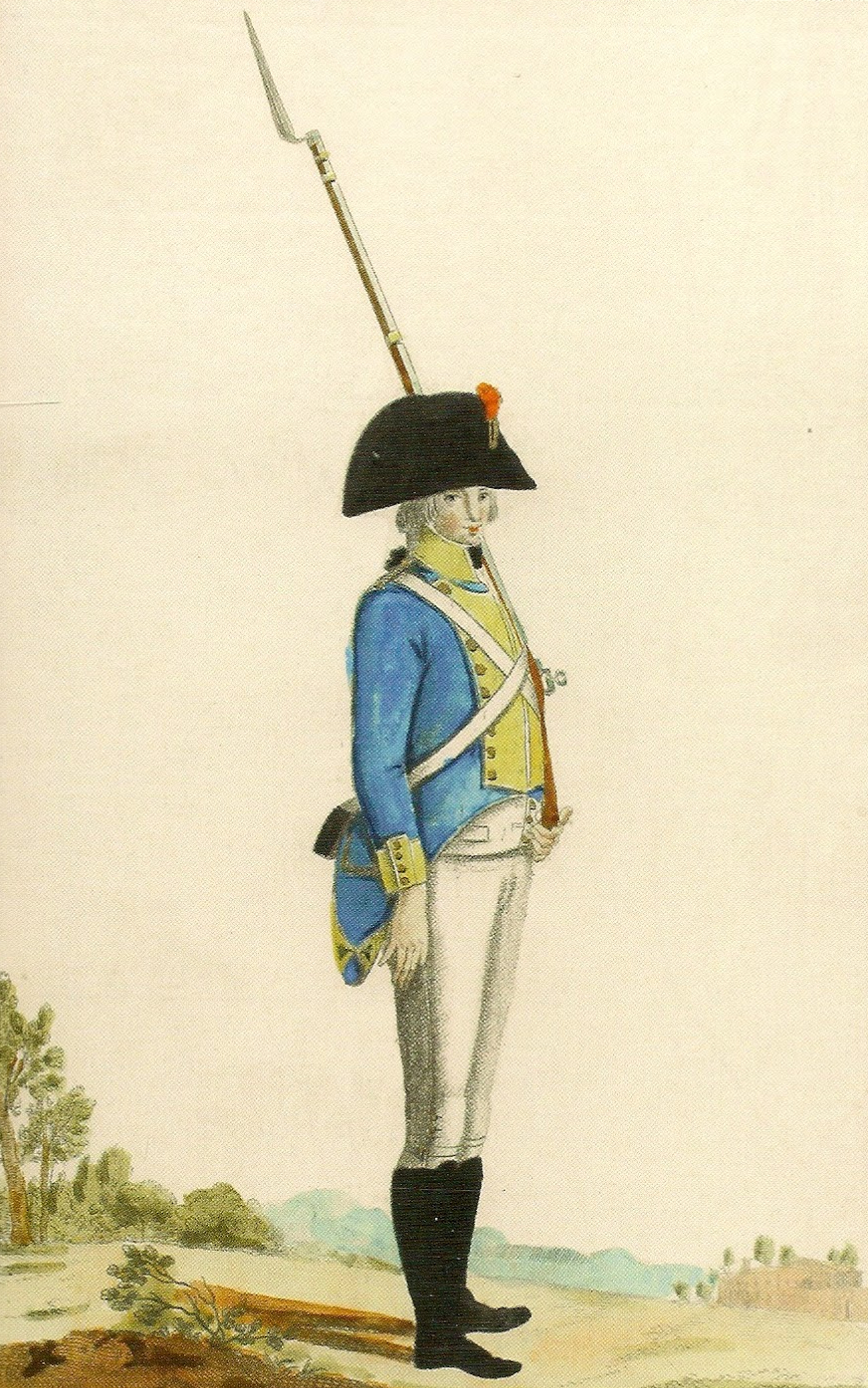
Illustration of a regimental private in 1806

The Irlanda Regiment (Regimiento "Irlanda") was one of the three Irish regiments in the service of the Spanish crown during the 18th and 19th centuries, its sister regiments being the Ultonia Regiment and the Hibernia Regiment.

== Background ==
The three "Irish" regiments, like other units before them, such as the Irish Tercio (Tercio de irlandeses), also known as the Irish Brigade, (Note: Not to be confused with Irish Brigade of the French Royal Army, formed in May 1690, and also composed of Irish exiles, led by Lord Mountcashel, nor with France's Irish Legion, which also saw much action during the Peninsular War.) which was raised in 1605 by Henry O'Neill to be incorporated into Spain's Army of Flanders, were raised from among the thousands of young Irishmen who, due to the Penal Laws, left their homes to take service with France and Spain.

The first of these regiments to be formed, Irlandia, was raised by levies in Ireland in 1638. The Hibernia Regiment was raised in 1703 (or 1709) by order of Philip V, from troops and officers from Spain's forces in France and Ultonia was raised later that same year. (Note: Other sources, such as Clark (2010) and Clonard (1857), give the date as 1709.)

Although the service records give no reasons for the transfers, there was a certain amount of mobility among the three sister regiments, which may have been due to the need to raise the number of men under arms before a specific military action. One notable case is that of Alejandro O'Reilly (1723–1794), who enlisted in the Hibernia Regiment in 1735 and worked his way up to lieutenant general (1767) before transferring to the Irlanda Regiment in 1772.

The 90 service records collected in the Libro de oficiales, sargentos primeros y cadetes del regimiento Irlanda (Register of Officers, Sergeants and Cadets of the Irlanda Regiment), drawn up by Lieutenant Colonel Juan MacKenna while the regiment was stationed at Tortosa in December 1774, shows that of the 21 staff officers and captains, all of whom were Irish-born, twelve had served exclusively with the Irlanda, while the remaining nine had previously served with other regiments. Among the 19 lieutenants and aides-de-camp, all of whom were also Irish-born, all had served exclusively with the Irlanda, except for one, who had transferred from the Hibernia. Among the 18 sub-lieutenants, none of whom had seen active service, eleven had served exclusively in the Irlanda while five had been transferred from the Ultonia Regiment at around the same time (1771–1721), one had been transferred from the Hibernia Regiment and another from the Asturias Regiment, all during that same period. As for the seventeen sergeants, none of whom were Irish, being mainly French (8) and Italian (7). All were experienced soldiers; three of the Italians and two of the Frenchmen had served exclusively with the Irlanda. Of the fifteen cadets, all Irish, none of whom had seen active service, three had been transferred from the Hibernia Regiment in 1774.

On the other hand, Joseph O'Donnell y O'Donnell, who enlisted in the Irlanda Regiment in 1739 and became its colonel in 1777, enlisted his three eldest sons, Leopoldo, Joseph (José) and Charles (Carlos), as boy cadets in the Irlanda and his three youngest sons, Henry (Enrique), Alejandro and Francisco, in one of the other sister regiments, the Hibernia Regiment. All six saw action during the Peninsular War

== Actions ==
=== Peninsular War ===
==== 1808 ====
By 1808, that is, at the start of the War, these three "Irish" regiments totalled only 1,900 men under arms, instead of the customary 5,000. On the other hand, most of the troops were no longer Irishmen, but of several nationalities.

Between March and June 1808, with the 1st Battalion stationed in Estremadura, and the 2nd and 3rd both in Andalusia, the three battalions of the regiment numbered only 513 men. By October/November, the three battalions had been incorporated into the Conde de Villariezo's 1st Division of General Castaños' Army of the Centre.

==== 1809 ====
At the Battle of Bailén (July 1809), as part of General Reding's 1st Division, its number had been brought up to 1,824 men and it was one of the very few regular regiments there to incorporate their full three battalions into General Castaños' field-army.

Following the victory at Bailen, two battalions of the regiment (Note: According to Oman (1902) At Bailen, "a thousand men were taken prisoners almost without firing a shot" and, citing other sources (Maupoey and Goicoechea, IN: Arteche, ii. 512), "Apparently they were the 1st battalion of the Irlanda regiment, and the militia of Jaen,..." Oman 1902, p. 194 (footnote 154).) were incorporated into the Army of Andalusia which joined General San Juan's Army of the Reserve of Madrid. Defeated at Somosierra these two battalions were among those which fled to Segovia and joined the Army of Extremadura.

== Colonels of the regiment ==
- Burke, Edward (Eduardo)
- Estrada, Julián (1817–1819)
- Ibeargh, Count: Serving under Field Marshal Benito de San Juan, Ibeargh led the 1st and 2nd Battalions of the Irlanda Regiment at Sepúlveda (28 November 1808). He was Governor of Motril from 1817 to 1819.
- Jones, Félix: appointed coronel on 11 June 1794;
- Kindelan, Vicente, father of Jean de Kindelan and Sebastián Kindelán
- Naghten, Juan: led the Regiment at the Battle of Bailen.
- O'Donnell y O'Donnell, Joseph: three of his sons also served with the regiment.

== Officers and other ranks mentioned in the historiography ==
- Aramendi, Gonzalo
- Camerford (also Comerford), José: sargento mayor of the regiment and uncle of Arturo O'Neill
- Erenas, José
- Escobar, Rafael
- Jones Rooth, Félix: son of Félix Jones
- Kindelan, Jean de, rose to lieutenant general of the Irlanda Regiment before transferring to the Ultonia Regiment to become its colonel in 1794
- Kindelán, Sebastián, governor of East Florida and of Santo Domingo
- Cegri, José León
- Mackena, José Ramón
- MaGrath, Juan
- O'Donnell, Carlos: A relative of Joseph O'Donnell y O'Donnell, Carlos joined the regiment in 1734, five years before Joseph.
- O'Donnell, Charles: His father was the Colonel of the regiment, Joseph O'Donnell y O'Donnell, and two other brothers also served with the regiment
- O'Donnell y Anhetan, Joseph: enlisted as a cadet in 1777, eventually rising to the lieutenant colonel of the regiment. His father was the Colonel of the regiment, Joseph O'Donnell y O'Donnell, and two other brothers also served with the regiment.
- O'Donnell y Anhetan, Leopoldo: Killed at the Siege of Figueras (1811). His father was the Colonel of the regiment, Joseph O'Donnell y O'Donnell, and two other brothers also served with the regiment.
- O'Neill, Arturo, entered the Irlanda Regiment as a cadet before transferring, as a sub-lieutenant, to the Hibernia Regiment, of which he would later become the colonel; nephew of the sargento mayor, José Camerford.
- O'Reilly, Alejandro, Governor and Captain-General of colonial Louisiana and Captain-general of Andalusia, enlisted in the Hibernia Regiment in 1735 before transferring to the Irlanda regiment in 1772.
- Recio Ruiz, Juan
- Retana, Vicente
- Talens de la Riba, Sebastián: killed at the combat of Alhama (Battle of Bubierca)
- Tortosa Vázquez, Joaquín
- Virués, Miguel: clonel of the 1st battalion (1817–1818)
- Wilson, Henry (Enrique): born in Ireland: Spanish liaison officer in Portugal and Britain during the Peninsular War. In service with the Irlanda Regiment in 1817.

== See also ==
- Spanish Army (Peninsular War)
- Flight of the Earls
- Flight of the Wild Geese
