= Irish Brigade =

Irish Brigade may refer to:

== Military units ==
- Irish Brigade (France), the Jacobite brigade in the French army, 1690–1792
- Irish Brigade (Spanish Civil War), organised by Eoin O'Duffy to fight for Franco's Nationalists
- Irish Brigade (Union Army), pro-Union Civil War brigade of Irish immigrants
- Irish Brigade (World War I), unrealised pro-German brigade of Irishmen recruited among British Army POWs in Germany
- Irish expedition to Scotland, an Irish brigade fighting on the Royalist side in Scotland during the War of the Three Kingdoms
- Catholic Irish Brigade (1794–1798), a British Army unit
- Franco-Irish Ambulance Brigade (1870)
- Tyneside Irish Brigade, World War I British Army brigade of Irish immigrants in Newcastle upon Tyne
- 30th Missouri Infantry Regiment, a Confederate brigade also known as Missouri Irish Brigade and Kelly's Irish Brigade
- A voluntary force under Myles O'Reilly that defended Rome in the Second Italian War of Independence; see Irish military diaspora § Papal States

== Other ==
- The Irish Brigade (band), an Irish rebel music group
- Independent Irish Party MPs in the House of Commons (1882–1914), were often described by opponents and supporters as the Irish Brigade

== See also ==
- North Irish Brigade, Infantry Depot M at Omagh
- Irish commandos, fought with the Boers during the Second Boer War (1899–1902)
- Irish Guards, a Foot Guards regiment of the British Army
- Irish Legion, raised by Napoleonic France in 1803-15
- Irish regiment, lists all such regiments in non-Irish armed forces
- London Irish Rifles Irish Regiment in the British Army
- Liverpool Irish Irish Regiment in the British Army
