= Battle of Zújar =

1811 battle during the Peninsular War

- Part of Peninsular War
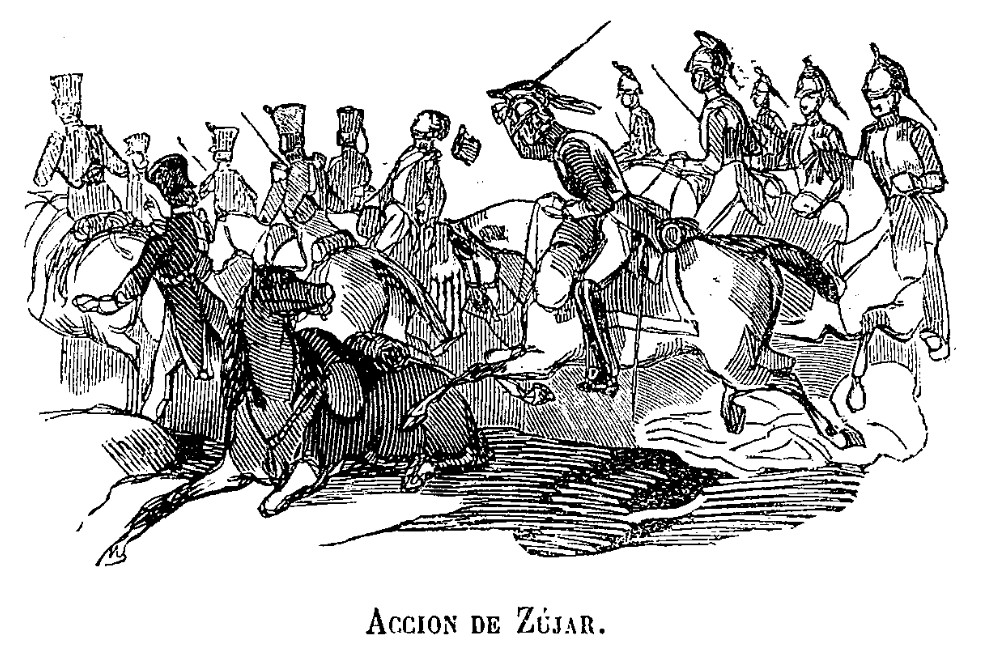
- Action at Zújar (1847 Spanish illustration)
Date	9 August 1811
Location	Zújar, Spain 37°32′N 2°50′W
Result	French victory

Belligerents
(France) First French Empire	Kingdom of Spain

Commanders and leaders
(France) Nicolas Soult (Note: Not directly involved in the battle; Godinot was in control.) (France) Nicolas Godinot (France) Pierre Benoit Soult	(Spain) Manuel Freire (Note: Not directly involved in the battle; O'Donnell was in control.) (Spain) Joseph O'Donnell

Strength
Campaign: 12,000; Zújar: 4,600–8,000	Campaign: 17,000; Zújar: 4,000

Casualties and losses
Campaign: unknown Zújar: light	Campaign: 4,000; Zújar: 1,423

Peninsular War: Siege of Cádiz
current battle

At the Battle of Zújar, part of the Peninsular War, on 9 August 1811 an Imperial French division from Nicolas Soult's army attacked a Spanish division under Manuel Freire de Andrade's Army of Murcia. The French division, led by Nicolas Godinot, defeated Joseph O'Donnell's Spanish division with heavy losses. Zújar is located 13 kilometres (8 mi) northwest of Baza, Granada in Spain.

Spanish armies under Freire and Joaquín Blake threatened the French grip on the south of Spain during the summer of 1811. Marshal Soult, who had just suffered a bloody defeat at the Battle of Albuera in May, left a colleague's army to observe the Anglo-Portuguese and marched south at the end of June. After driving off Blake's army, the marshal moved east with 12,000 men to deal with the Army of Murcia. Freire's army had enjoyed initial success in its campaign against Jean François Leval's weak IV Corps. At the beginning of August, Freire was joined by Blake's force, which had been shipped to the Region of Murcia by a British naval squadron. The arrival of Soult with reinforcements quickly turned the tables. While Soult faced Freire's main force, Godinot's division brushed aside one Spanish force, then threatened to block Freire's line of retreat. After Godinot savaged O'Donnell's division at Zújar, Freire was able to get away. But French cavalry under Pierre Benoit Soult crushed his rear guard at Las Vertientes, east of Cúllar. After the twin defeats, the Murcian army scattered into the mountains.

== Background ==
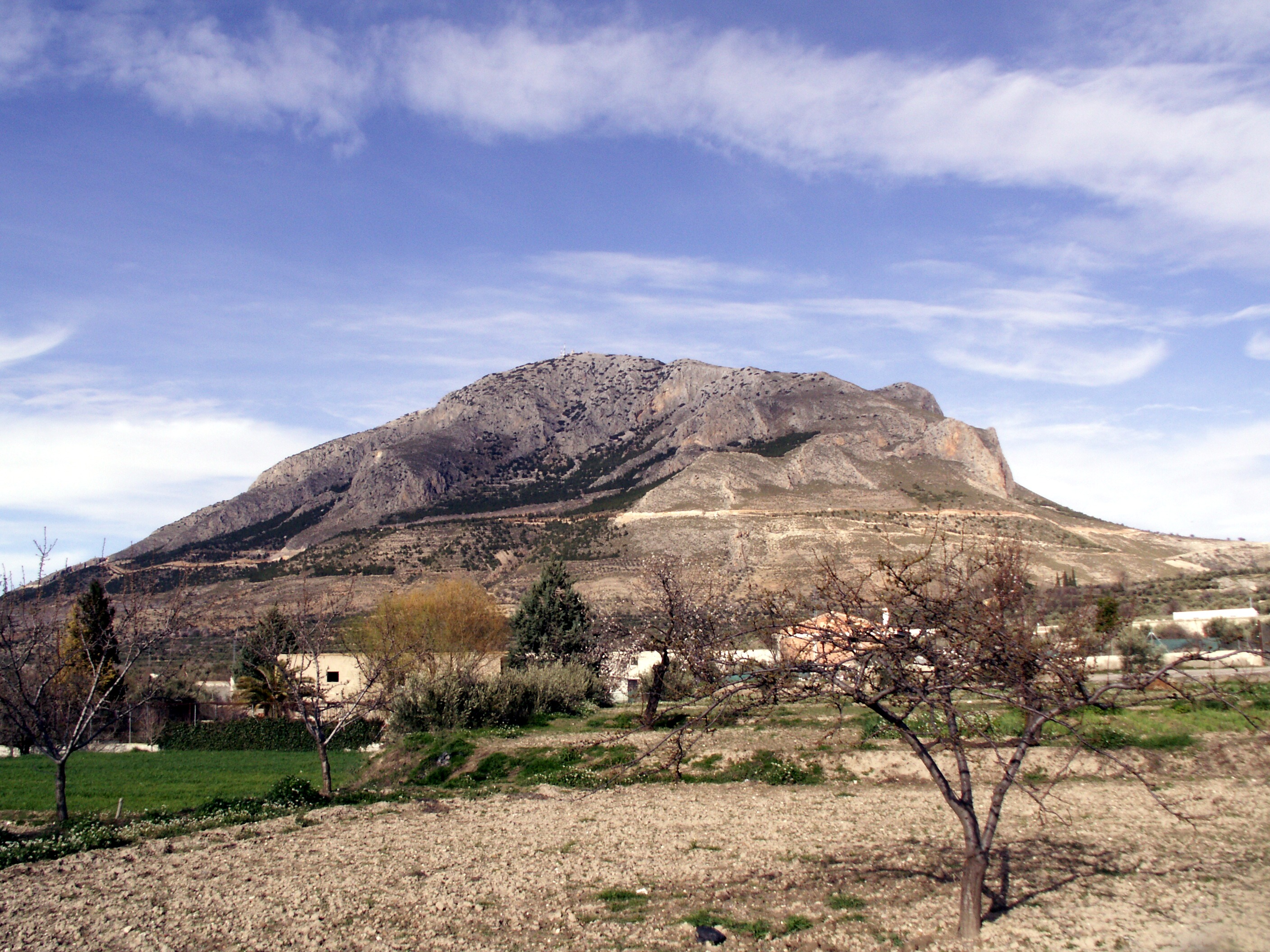
The Cerro Jabalcon towers over Zújar

After having been defeated at the Battle of Baza on 4 November 1810, the Army of Murcia remained inert. Defending against it was the French IV Corps under General of Division Horace Sébastiani. In April 1811, Marshal Nicolas Soult began drawing troops away from the area so that he could strike at an Anglo-Portuguese army to the west. At this time, General of Division Jean François Leval assumed command of the seriously attenuated IV Corps.

On 1 June 1811, General Manuel Freire de Andrade commanded 14,453 soldiers present under arms in the Army of Murcia. Also known as the 3rd Army, this body of troops consisted of three infantry and two cavalry divisions. Brigadier General La Cuadra commanded 4,015 men in the 1st Division, Brigadier General Juan Creagh led 4,442 soldiers in the 2nd Division, Brigadier General Antonio Sanz directed 3,220 infantry in the 3rd Division, Brigadier General Manuel Ladrón de Guevara commanded 1,014 troopers in the 1st Cavalry Division, and Brigadier General V. Osorio led 709 horsemen in the 2nd Cavalry Division. There were 786 artillerymen and 267 sappers. The 2,180-man garrison of Cartagena also fell under Freire's orders.

Taking advantage of French weakness, Freire pushed westward on the Lorca to Baza to Granada highway with the divisions of Creagh, Sanz, and the cavalry. Meanwhile, La Cuadra's division diverged to the north on the road to Pozo Alcón. Freire's advance was slow and cautious, allowing Leval to retreat without being hustled along. Nevertheless, the French general abandoned the Mediterranean coast between Almería and Motril and the towns of Baza and Guadix. Troops from La Cuadra's command raided as far northwest as Úbeda. Agents from Freire's column stirred up the local guerillas, including the band led by the Conde de Montijo. These cut the supply lines between Granada and Málaga. With only 3,000 to 4,000 troops, Leval was in a dilemma. He was out of touch with his Polish division in Málaga and his garrisons at Jaén and Cordova. To seriously oppose Freire, he had to concentrate his command, but he was forbidden to do so by Soult.

Meanwhile, William Beresford's Allied army defeated Soult at the Battle of Albuera on 16 May 1811. Casualties in the engagement were appalling, with French losses estimated at 7,000 men killed, wounded, and captured. British casualties numbered 4,156, while Spanish losses were 1,359, and 389 Portuguese fell, for a total of 5,904 Allied casualties. Despite the victory, the Second Siege of Badajoz ended with the Allies raising the siege on 10 June and falling back to Elvas in Portugal. This was because Marshal Auguste Marmont appeared on the scene with a second French army. Meanwhile, Joaquín Blake took 10,000 Spanish troops and marched south. Hearing reports of Freire's activity and worried about Blake's column, Soult marched away on 24 June, leaving Marmont to face the Allies. First he headed to Niebla where Blake was besieging a French garrison. The Spanish general marched rapidly south and his troops were taken on board a British squadron at Ayamonte on 8 July.

Blake's force landed at Cádiz on 10 July and the general immediately lobbied the Supreme Central and Governing Junta of the Kingdom to be made Captain General of the provinces of Murcia, Aragon, and Valencia. Granted his wish, he sailed at the end of July with 7,000 infantry and 500 cavalry in the divisions of José Pascual de Zayas y Chacón and Manuel Lardizabal. Landing at Almería on 31 July, Blake marched his troops north toward Baza. This accretion of strength would place Leval's outnumbered force in a truly alarming situation. However, Blake and Zayas hurried off to Valencia where they began to prepare the city to face Marshal Suchet's army, which hovered to the northeast.

== Battle ==
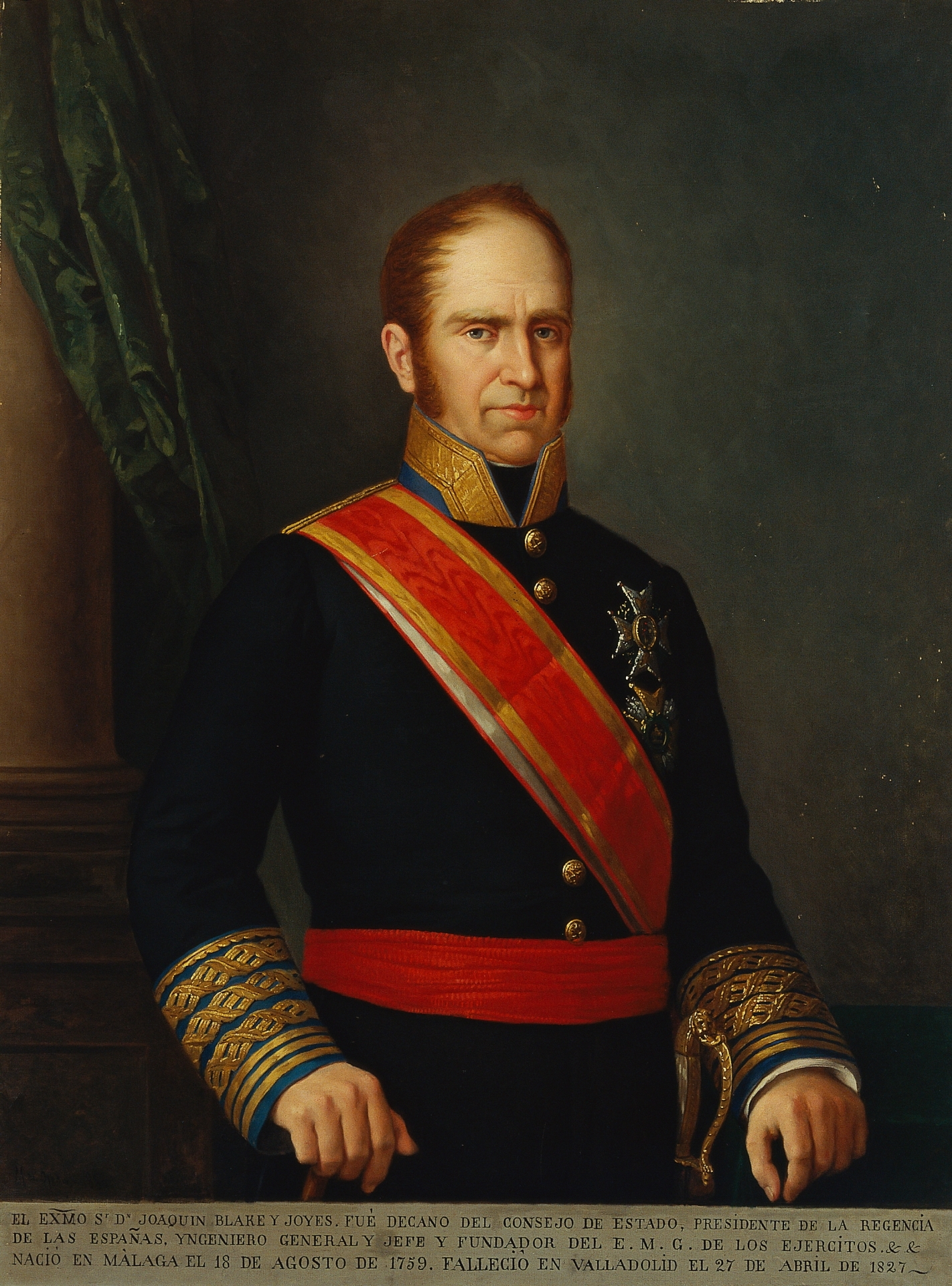
Joaquín Blake

On 3 August 1811, Blake's troops joined Freire's army near Baza, so that he had 15,000 foot soldiers and nearly 2,000 horsemen on hand. With Zayas absent, Joseph O'Donnell became the acting commander of his division. At Albuera, Lardizabal's command had included two battalions of the Murcia Line Infantry, and one battalion each of the Campo Mayor, Canarias, and 2nd of Leon Line Infantry Regiments. Zayas' division had consisted of the 2nd and 4th Battalions of the Spanish Guards, the 4th Battalion of the Walloon Guards, the Legion Estranjera, and the Ciudad Real, Irlanda, Patria, and Toledo Line Infantry Regiments.

Being superseded by Blake seemed to take away what little initiative Freire had. Historian Charles Oman wrote that Freire had Leval "absolutely at his mercy" beginning on 3 August. Yet all the Spanish general did was position his army behind a ravine near Gor, which was 12 miles (19 km) west of Baza. At the end of July, Soult ordered General Nicolas Godinot to march to Jaén. When he heard that Freire was being reinforced, he left Seville on 3 August to rescue Leval. Soult took four cavalry regiments under General Marie Victor de Fay, marquis de Latour-Maubourg and part of General Nicolas François Conroux's division. After a forced march, the French marshal arrived at Granada on 7 August.

Between 3 and 7 August 1811, Freire frittered away his chance to crush Leval. Soult left Granada and reached the Gor ravine on 9 August with 6,000 infantry and 1,500 cavalry. The position was so strong that Soult made no attempt to attack, but instead mounted occasional bombardments of the Spanish lines. Earlier, Soult had ordered Godinot to advance from Jaén against La Cuadra's position at Pozo Alcón. Godinot left Baeza on the 7th with at least 4,000 foot soldiers and 600 horsemen. In the face of this advance, La Cuadra abandoned Pozo Alcón on 8 August and fell back to the east in the direction of Huéscar. When he heard that Godinot was coming down from the northwest, Freire sent O'Donnell's 4,000 men to occupy a blocking position at Zújar and ordered La Cuadra to join him there.

On 9 August 1811, Godinot's division encountered O'Donnell at Zújar. The French general's division included four battalions of the 8th Line, and three battalions each of the 16th Light and 54th Line Infantry Regiments. This force may have numbered as many as 8,000 men. Hoping to be reinforced by La Cuadra, O'Donnell placed his troops behind the Guardal River on the outskirts of the town. In the afternoon, Godinot fell on the Spanish troops and routed them. O'Donnell's division lost 423 killed and wounded, and 1,000 captured or missing.

== Outcome ==
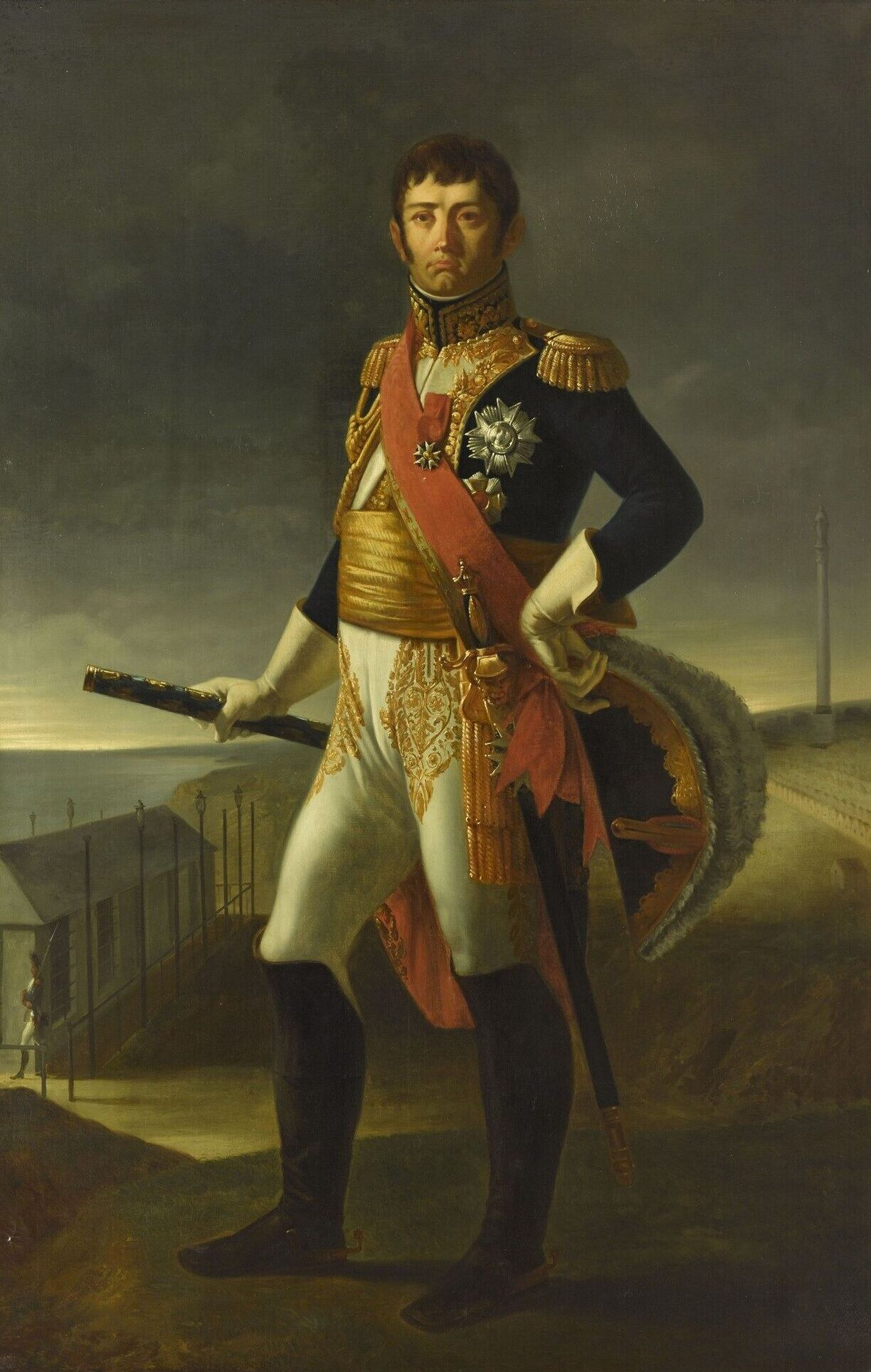
Marshal Jean-de-Dieu Soult

Godinot was only 8 miles (13 km) from Baza. Possession of that city would cut off Freire's retreat route, but the French general hesitated. La Cuadra was reported approaching from the east and his men were worn out from marching and fighting. So Godinot halted his troops and sent out scouts. Meanwhile, Freire heard of O'Donnell's rout and slipped away from the Gor ravine in the evening and marched his entire army through Baza at night. At daylight on 10 August, Soult found the Gor lines empty and ordered Latour-Maubourg to conduct an immediate pursuit.

The French cavalry caught up with Freire's rear guard at Las Vertientes, 10 miles (16 km) east of Baza. The Spanish general posted the divisions of Loy and Osorio to protect his infantry. However, General of Brigade Pierre Benoit Soult led a charge which routed the Spanish cavalry. With their cavalry shattered, the Spanish infantry left the main highway and made for the hills. Creagh, Lardizabal, and La Cuadra retreated to the north in the direction of Caravaca de la Cruz while Sanz and O'Donnell withdrew to the south toward Oria and Albox. The flight was so rapid that one retreating column covered 37 miles (60 km) on the 10th.

Marshal Soult reached Vélez-Rubio on the main highway with 12,000 troops. With Freire's army split in two, the city of Murcia, 70 miles (113 km) east was utterly unprotected. But the marshal determined to suppress the guerillas instead. On 14 August the two parts of the Spanish army rendezvoused at Alcantarilla, just west of Murcia, where Blake rejoined them. The army numbered 4,000 fewer men than it had when it began the campaign. On the 14th, Soult turned back to the west and split his army into several columns. One column reoccupied Almería while the others began to hunt down the guerilla bands. The French laid a heavy hand on the countryside, sacking villages and shooting people out of hand. Soult also exhibited harshness. During the campaign, the French captured Charles Cléry, an émigré officer, the son of the servant of King Louis XVI. Though the man had since served in both the Austrian and Spanish armies, Soult had the man court-martialled and shot.

The French did not have things all their own way. Conde de Montijo's band captured two companies of Poles near Motril on 21 August. Soon afterward, his men repulsed a 1,500-man French column. The next combat in the region was the Battle of Bornos on 5 November 1811.
