= Félix Jones (soldier) =

Spanish army officer (18th century – 1817)

Félix Jones (fl. 1751–1817) was an Irish (Note: "... an Irish officer, in spite of his Welsh name...". (Oman, 1902: p. 177.))-Spanish military commander.

His son, Félix Jones Rooth, also a military commander, was teniente del rey (Note: Similar to the British 'lord-lieutenant'.) of Tarragona from 1835 to 1845.

== Early career ==
In 1784, Jones was promoted to lieutenant colonel and colonel in 1791.

In 1794, he was given command of the Irlanda Regiment. He was promoted to brigadier in 1795.

== Peninsular War ==
In 1807, following the signing of the Treaty of Fontainebleau, allowing for the invasion of Portugal, Jones led one of Solano's divisions into Portugal, (Note: Solano's was one of the three auxiliary Spanish corps that aided General Junot's Army of the Gironde in invading Portugal. Setting out from Badajoz with 9,500 troops, Solano was to take the garrison town of Elvas and then to march on Lisbon along the left bank of the Tagus.(Oman, 1902: p. 31.)) where he took the town of Estremoz.

He was promoted to field marshal in January 1808. On 29 May, shortly before being murdered by a mob in Cádiz, Solano had sent Jones to Seville giving him command of the troops there and with orders to raise a milicia.

Major general Jones was later given command of the 3rd Division, numbering some 5,415 men, including 709 horse, of Castaños's field army at Bailén. (Note: The commanders of the other three divisions were Generals Reding, Coupigny, and Lapeña. (Oman, 1902: p. 177.))

In 1808, he was appointed military and political governor of El Puerto de Santa María and interim governor of Cádiz, substituting Tomás de Morla, who had been sent to Madrid. As military governor of Cádiz, on 22 February 1809 Jones managed to quell a riot, saving the lives of, amongst others, the political prisoners at the Castle of Santa Catalina, including General Carrafa and José de Iturrigaray. Later that year, Jones would be substituted by Francisco Javier Venegas.

== Post-war career ==
He was awarded the Grand Cross of Saint Hermenegild in 1817.
