= Tulio O'Neill O'Keefe =

Spanish army officer of Irish descent (1784–1855)

Tulio O'Neill y O'Keefe
- Born: 29 September 1784; Christiansted (Virgin Islands)
- Died: 30 August 1855 (aged 70) Seville
- Conflicts: American Revolutionary War; Great Siege of Gibraltar; War of the Pyrenees; Ferrol Expedition; War of the Oranges; Peninsular War; Evacuation of La Romana's division; Battle of Valmaseda; Battle of Espinosa de los Monteros; Siege of Olivença; Battle of Albuera

Tulio O'Neill O'Keefe, 7th Marquis of La Granja (1784–1855), was a general of Irish origin who served in the Spanish army.

== Family ==
His parents were Tulio O'Neill O'Kelly and Catalina O'Keeffe Vélez, both of Irish origin, and his uncle, Arturo O'Neill, was a lieutenant general in the Spanish army and a Spanish colonial governor. Through his marriage to Manuela Luisa de Castilla y Quevedo, Marchioness of La Granja, Tulio O'Neill O'Keefe became the 7th Marquis of La Granja.

== Early career ==
He graduated as a captain in the Infantry Militias before being attached to the Puerto Rico Regiment. In 1807, he joined the Division of the North, a division, composed of 15,000 men under the command of the Marquis de La Romana, Pedro Caro y Sureda, that was initially deployed, between 1807 and 1808, to perform garrison duties in Hamburg under Marshal Bernadotte. In March 1808, along with a Franco-Belgian unit of approximately the same size, the unit was deployed to Denmark, with the two-fold objective of protecting that country, also an ally of Napoleon, and preparing for an invasion of Sweden.

== Peninsular War ==
Following the Evacuation of La Romana's division, O'Neill saw action at the Battle of Valmaseda and at the Battle of Espinosa de los Monteros, in November 1808. The following month he was promoted to Infantry captain.

Promoted to lieutenant general in 1809, at the end of that year he was given command of the Regiment of Hibernia. At the beginning of 1810, he was appointed aide-de-camp to La Romana in 1810 and promoted to lieutenant colonel shortly thereafter, and in January 1811, following the death of La Romana, he was appointed aide-de-camp to General Castaños, under whom he saw action at the Siege of Olivença and at the Battle of Albuera, as colonel of the Princess's Regiment.

In 1812, he saw action at the Siege of Ciudad Rodrigo and at the Battle of Salamanca, entering Madrid the followin November.

In 1813, he took part in the Siege of Pamplona. Later that year, he was promoted to brigadier and pursued Napoleon's retreating army into France. The following year he took part in the Battle of Bayonne.

== Post-war years ==
Between 1820 and 1822, during the Trienio Liberal, he was the commander-in-chief of Murcia until his retirement. However, following the restoration of Ferdinand VII, O'Neill returned to active service and was appointed military govervor forst of Seville and then, in 1826, of Ceuta. In 1828, he was given command of a brigade of the Royal Guard and promoted to field marshal.
