= Juan Antonio de Fábregues-Boixar =

Spanish army officer (1777–1844)

- Born: 7 July 1777; Tortosa (Tarragona)
- Died: 30 July 1844 (aged 67) Córdoba
- Conflicts: Peninsular War; Battle of Valmaseda; Battle of Durango; Battle of Espinosa de los Monteros; Battle of Igualada; Battle of Vic; Vilafranca del Penedés (Manresa); Siege of Tortosa; Siege of Tarragona

Juan Antonio de Fábregues-Boixar Talarn, 2nd Baron de la Font de Quinto (7 July 1777 – 30 June 1844), was a Spanish army officer during the Peninsular War. (Note: Count Clonard (1854) refers to him either as Barón de Fuente Quinto (Clonard, 1854) or Fuentequinto (Clonard, 1857).)

== Early career ==
Fábregues-Boixar enlisted as a cadet in the Infantry regiment of the Crown, seeing action on several occasions against British troops in the Ampurdán before going on to patrol against smuggling in the Eastern Pyrenees.

== Peninsular War ==
=== 1808 ===
After returning to Spain with La Romana's Division of the North that August, on board HMS Edgar, Fábregues-Boixar saw action at Valmaseda (4 November), Durango (10 November), Espinosa de los Monteros.

=== 1810 ===
He saw further action at Igualada (4 January), Vic (20 February) and Vilafranca del Penedés (Manresa) (26 March).

With Tortosa besieged, Fábregues-Boixar volunteered to join the defenders and distinguished himself on two sorties, being wounded on the last one.

=== 1811 ===
With Tortosa capitulating on 2 January, he was taken prisoner but, a month later, on the journey to France, he managed to escape, reaching Tarragona, where he took part in its defence until the end of May when, on the orders of General Marquis of Campoverde, he abandoned the city.

Commissioned by the captain general of Catalonia, Lacy, to raise a provisional battalion, he was given command of the Mataró Regiment and transferred to the Ultonia Regiment, unit with which he would see action on several occasions the following year.

=== 1812 ===
With the Ultonia Regiment, Fábregues-Boixar took part in combats at the Francolí fort (8 May), the strategic bridge at Molins de Rei (25 May), the fort at Mataró (26 June). Appointed colonel of the regiment, he later saw action at the fort of Reús (19 December 1812).

=== 1814 ===
In May 1814, Fábregues-Boixar was colonel of the Gerona Regiment.

== Postwar career ==
In 1823, he was appointed colonel of the newly formed 6th Light Infantry Regiment, based in Granada, which had been re-organised from the old Navarra Regiment.
