= Juan José Creagh =

Spanish army officer (1765–1829)

Juan José Creagh de Lacy
- Born: 15 March 1765; Monzón (Huesca)
- Died: 4 June 1829 (aged 64) Almería
- Conflicts: American Revolutionary War; Invasion of Minorca (1781); Siege of Ceuta (1790–1791); Siege of Oran (1790–1792); War of the First Coalition; War of the Pyrenees; War of the Second Coalition; War of the Oranges; Peninsular War; Battle of Bailén; Battle of Molins de Rei; Battle of Alcañiz; Battle of María; Battle of Zújar; Battle of Saguntum; Siege of Valencia (1812); Siege of Pamplona (1813)

Juan José Creagh de Lacy (1765–1829) was a Spanish army officer during the Peninsular War.

== Early career ==
The son of Guillermo Creagh, Colonel of the Ultonia Regiment, Juan José Creagh enlisted as a cadet in the same regiment. In 1779 he was promoted to sub-lieutenant.

== American Revolutionary War ==
He saw action in 1782 at the siege of Fort St. Philip during the Invasion of Minorca before being sent to the Campo de Gibraltar where he was stationed until 1787. That year, he was transferred to Oran, where he was promoted to lieutenant the following year and took part in the defence of the fortress-city, before going on to Siege of Ceuta.

== War of the First Coalition ==
In 1793 he was appointed aide-de-camp of the Castille Regiment of Volunteers, promoted to captain the following year and transferred to the Army of Catalonia to take part in the War of the Pyrenees.

In 1797, serving under Antonio Gutiérrez de Otero y Santayana at Santa Cruz de Tenerife, Creagh took part in repelling the British naval assault when, at the head of 30 men from his Infantry battalion and 50 armed farm labourers, he marched to cut off the defiles that the British troops would need to use in their invasion. Creagh's men were soon joined by 500 men from the La Laguna militia and a large number of armed civilians. Faced with such overwhelming numbers, the British troops returned to their ships under cover of night.

== War of the Second Coalition ==
After participating in the War of the Oranges, in 1802 he was appointed sargento mayor of the Regiment of the Crown and two years later he took command of the Zaragoza Regiment.

== Peninsular War ==
=== 1808 ===
Stationed in the Canary Islands as sargento mayor of the Canarias Battalion, at the outbreak of the war, on receiving the news that Ferdinand VII had abdicated in favour of Napoleon, Creagh, was also a member of the Junta Suprema de Tenerife, together with Carlos O'Donnell, the teniente del rey (lieutenant-governor) and second-in-command, that voted to destitute the captain general of the Canary Islands, Fernando de Cagigal, and replace him with the Marquis of Villanueva del Prado, Alonso de Nava Grimón.

Acting on the orders of O'Donnell, the new Captain-general, Creagh was sent on 21 July to Las Palmas with orders to arrest the Governor of Gran Canaria, Colonel José Verdugo de Altivurria, who was also accused of being an afrancesado, and substitute him as commander-in-chief of that place. Creagh remained there as governor until the following 1 September. (Note: Contrary to his biography at Spain's Royal Academy of History, which places him at Bailén under General Castaños (Isabel Sánchez), several sources place him at Las Palmas at that time.)

That same month he was appointed colonel of the Granada Volunteer Regiment, unit with which he took part in several actions, including the Battle of Molins de Rei.

=== 1809 ===
Creagh served under General Blake at the battles of Alcañiz and María, where he led Blake's Vanguard Brigade, made up of two battalions of the Almeria Regiment and one battalion of the Valencia Chasseurs Regiment, numbering 2,298 men in total.

=== 1810 ===
Promoted to brigadier, he was given command of the 2nd Division of the Army of Murcia (also known as the 3rd Army), with which he saw action in Andalusia, at Baza (November).

=== 1811 ===
For the Summer campaign of 1811, Creagh's 2nd Division, with 4,442 officers and men present under arms, was the largest infantry division in Manuel Freire de Andrade's Army of Murcia. That August, Creagh's division fought at the Battle of Zújar.

The following October, responding to rumours—false rumours, it turned out—that King Joseph was sending a column of reinforcements, via Cuenca, to meet up with Marshal Suchet, Blake ordered Mahy to select the best of his troops and march towards the French troops. Mahy, leaving Freire in command at Murcia, took seven selected battalions of infantry under Creagh and the Marquis of Montijo, plus 800 horse and one battery, and moved northward. Arriving at Cuenca on October 15th, Mahy found there was only one battalion and two squadrons of Joseph's reinforcements, a force which had rapidly evacuated the city and fled back towards Madrid the moment the Spanish forces had appeared. The "pick of the Murcian army had been completely wasted for some twenty days in a circular march against a non-existent enemy".

That same month, the morning state for Blake's army the Battle of Saguntum puts Mahy's division at 4,600 infantry, under the Marquis of Montijo and Creagh, plus 830 horse.

Creagh's division also fought at the Siege of Valencia.

=== 1812 ===
Transferred to Cádiz, Creagh was promoted to field marshal and given command of the 2nd Division of the Reserve Army of Andalusia.

=== 1813 ===
He was wounded in the leg at Pamplona.

== Post-war career ==
After the war, Creagh was appointed captain general of Aragon and in April 1814 escorted Ferdinand VII to Valencia. The following September he gave up his post and retired to barracks at Málaga.
