= Ultonia Regiment (Spain) =

Spanish army regiment (18th–19th centuries)

The Ultonia Regiment (Regimiento "Ultonia") (Note: Ultonia, i.e. Ulster (Oman, 1902).) was one of the three Irish regiments in the service of the Spanish crown during the 18th and 19th centuries, its sister regiments being the Irlanda Regiment and the Hibernia Regiment.

Among its many actions, during the Peninsular War the Ultonia Regiment was garrisoned at Girona during the first (June 1808), second (24 July to 16 August 1808) and third sieges (1809) of that city.

== Background ==
The three "Irish" regiments, like other units before them, such as the Irish Tercio (Tercio de irlandeses), also known as the Irish Brigade, (Note: Not to be confused with Irish Brigade of the French Royal Army, formed in May 1690, and also composed of Irish exiles, led by Lord Mountcashel.) which was raised in 1605 by Henry O'Neill to be incorporated into Spain's Army of Flanders, were raised from among the thousands of young Irishmen who, due to the Penal Laws, left their homes to take service with France and Spain.

The first of these regiments to be formed, Irlandia, was raised by levies in Ireland in 1638. The Hibernia Regiment was raised in 1703 (or 1709) by order of Philip V, from troops and officers from Spain's forces in France and Ultonia was raised later that same year. (Note: Other sources, such as Clark (2010) and Clonard (1857), give the date as 1709.)

Although the service records give no reasons for the transfers, there was a certain amount of mobility among the three sister regiments, which may have been due to the need to raise the number of men under arms before a specific military action or some other circumstance.

== History ==
The origins of the Ultonia Regiment were at Zaragoza where, on 1 November 1709, the Marquis of Castelar, (Note: Castelar would, in 1721, become King Phillip V's Secretary of State for War.) acting on behalf of Phillip V, would authorise Colonel Demetrio MacAulif to raise the MacAulif Regiment, to be formed by one battalion. Originally numbering 408 men, the unit's first duties were to pursue the groups of "seditious" forces in Aragon.

By 1718, it had come to be known as the Ultonia Regiment. By 1811, it had been reduced to just one battalion, known as the Distinguished Ultonia Regiment (Regimiento de Distinguidos de Ultonia) and by 1815 it had returned to being called the Ultonia Regiment.

== Actions ==
=== War of the Spanish Succession ===
Having been incorporated into the Bourbon-Spanish army of Phillip V in his withdrawal from Catalonia, the regiment's first battle, at Almenara (27 July 1709), to the north of Lleida, resulted in defeat against an Allied force of British, Portuguese, Dutch and Austrian troops supporting Archduke Charles. The following month, the regiment fought at Peñalba (Huesca) (11 August) and were again defeated at the Battle of Saragossa (20 August).

On 11 June 1715, 24 infantry battalions and 1,200 horse of the Ultonia Regiment, together with the corresponding artillery, set sail for Mallorca and Ibiza, accompanied by 18 warships and six galleys. Commanded by Lieutenant-general Asfeld, after capturing the fortress at Alcudia, the regiment laid siege to Palma, which capitulated on 2 June. Ibiza surrendered forthwith.

=== War of the Quadruple Alliance ===
At the beginning of 1718, the regiment's name was officially established as Ultonia. The following July, 700 men of the regiment joined Marquis de Lede's expeditionary force sent to reconquer Sicily, where the regiment took the citadel at Messina.

On 20 June 1719, the commander-in-chief of the Ultonia Regiment, Colonel Tadeo Mac-Aulif, was killed at the Battle of Francavilla. The following year, the regiment landed at Alicante and, with Guillermo Lacy now in command, the Ultonia Regiment marched to garrison Valencia.

In 1722, the regiment was given the command of the region of Aragon and the garrison at Zaragoza.

=== Anglo-Spanish War (1727–1729) ===
In 1727, the regiment marched to take part in the Siege of Gibraltar where they remained for the duration of the siege. From there, the regiment was sent to Barcelona where its two battalions were brought up to number and stationed at villages around the city, with orders to embark at a moment's notice.

=== Spanish conquest of Oran (1732) ===
In 1732 the whole regiment marched to Valencia, where nine of its companies, together with the general staff, were sent to Alicante to join the expedition to Africa, forming part of the division led by General René. That November they sailed for Oran, where they were to reinforce the units that had gained control of that fortress-city.

In 1795, following the Peace of Basel, the regiment was stationed in Galicia at several garrisons along the border with Portugal and along the coast.

=== War of the Second Coalition ===
On 31 December 1798, the 1st Battalion, having marched to Cádiz, embarked for the Canary Islands, under the orders of the Count of Donadio, to reinforce the archipelago against British attack. The 2nd and 3rd battalions are stationed on the peninsula guarding the frontiers.

=== War of the Oranges ===
In 1801, the 2nd Battalion garrisons Vigo while the 3rd Battalion is prepared to enter into action against Portugal.

=== Interregnum ===
In 1802, the 1st Battalion sailed from the Canary Islands to Barcelona and marched to rejoin the regiment in Galicia.

In 1804, the 1st battalion was sent to join Francisco Taranco's troops to put down the popular uprising in Vizcaya (known as the Zamacolada).

In 1806, the whole regiment was sent to Catalonia to garrison Girona and other detachments at the border.

=== Peninsular War ===
==== 1808 ====
By 1808, that is, at the start of the War, these "Irish" regiments had only 1,900 men under arms between the three of them, instead of the customary 5,000. On the other hand, most of the troops were no longer Irishmen, but of several nationalities.

In 1808, the garrison at Girona, now reduced to 351 troops and 73 officers, but supported by armed citizens, repel General Duhesme's attack/siege. (Note: Oman (1908) points out that the regiment "still contained many officers of the old Jacobite strain, as may be seen by consulting the list of killed and wounded, where such names as O'Donnell, Macarthy, Nash, Fitzgerald, Pierson, Coleby, Candy, occur: but it had just been raised from 200 to 800 bayonets by filling the depleted cadre with Catalan recruits, and all the junior lieutenants, newly appointed, were Catalans also. So there was little Irish about it save the names of some of its senior officers.") In time for the third siege, the regiment at Girona had seen its numbers raised from 200 to 800 bayonets, mainly made up of Catalan recruits. However, while on 6 May 1809 its three battalions numbered 800 men, the number that remained on 11 December, the day of surrender, had been reduced to 250.

The 1st and 2nd Battalions, numbering only 300 men each, were incorporated into Count of Caldagues' division of the Army of Catalonia and sent as the vanguard, under Brigadier Mariano Álvarez de Castro, to the Ampurdan region. Of this unit, 126 men (or a "skeleton battalion" of 150 men) was sent to reinforce the small core of regular troops of the garrison, under the command of the governor, Colonel Peter O'Daly, who had distinguished himself at Girona, at the Siege of Roses (November to 5 December 1808).

==== 1809 ====
At the beginning of 1809, due to the fear that the French army would again besiege Girona, the 2nd and 3rd battalions, except for a detachment that remained at Tarragona, were garrisoned at Girona, under the newly appointed governor, Álvarez de Castro. Besieged once again, from the beginning of May, in June the Ultonia garrison carried out a sortie to reinforce Hostalrich with 200 men. The following month, another detachment crossed the siege lines to join the troops under Enrique O'Donnell at Hostalrich, where they distinguished themselves in combat at Banyolas on 30 August. Several other successful sorties were carried out throughout the siege and several French assaults were also repelled.

However, with a strong French blockade of the city, the only way Blake, based at Sant Hilari Sacalm, could get a convoy into Girona was by diverting the besiegers' attention: he therefore sent Lieutenant Manuel Llanden of the Ultonia Regiment to attack the heights of Los Ángeles, from where they would be able to protect the convoy. Blake himself advanced with the Reserve and sent Enrique O'Donnell on, with 1,200 infantry and some cavalry to attack the strong French position at Brunyola. Pedro Sarsfield, leading the main attack, then successfully drove the French troops out of their entrenchments. The convoy, of some 4,000 infantry and 500 horse, under García Conde, made it into Girona, with 3,000 troops staying on as reinforcements.

A detachment of the regiment again distinguished itself at Bàscara on 14 September. Later that month, Colonel Rudolfo Marshal was killed in action defending the breach of Girona.

At the end of the siege, Álvarez de Castro was taken first to Narbonne and then to Sant Ferran Castle, while the officers and general staff of the Ultonia garrison were taken prisoner to Dijon.

==== 1810 ====
In 1810, the remaining units of the Ultonia Regiment that had not been taken prisoner at Girona were reorganised and incorporated into the 2nd Division of the Army of the Right, under Enrique O'Donnell, taking part in the Battle of Vic. The unit was later transferred to the 3rd Division, under the Marquis of Campoverde, and saw action in the province of Lleida at the bridge of Balaguer (15 July) and at Puiggròs (17 August).

Having been reduced to just one battalion, now known as the Distinguidos de Ultonia, it was incorporated into the Reserve Division of the Army of the Left camped at Arbeca, near Tarragona. This battalion saw action at Riva (25 August), at Cervera (5 September), at San Andrés de Palomar (19 September) and at Santa Margarida i els Monjos (28 September).

==== 1811 ====
Having been transferred back to Campoverde's 2nd Division, and once again with two battalions, the Ultonia Regiment saw action at Riudecols and at the nearby Les Voltes (1 January), and two weeks later, at the Battle of El Pla, for which the regiment’s commanding officer, Vicente Mac-Grath, was awarded a gold medal. The following February, the regiment covered the army's retreat from Guissona to Torá and on 31 March took part in another Spanish victory at Manresa.

Troops from the Ultonia formed one of the five battalions of regular troops, plus the 3,000 miqueletes, garrisoned at Sant Ferran Castle under Brigadier General Juan Antonio Martínez, that had been holding out at the Siege of Figueras (10 April to 19 August 1811).

With General Luis de Lacy appointed captain-general of Catalonia in June, he sent the 2nd Battalion, as part of a 3,000-strong force under Eroles into France and sacked several villages in the region of Cerdanya in reprisal for the French attacks in Catalonia, and defeating a French force at Saillagouse (8 August). By the following month, Lacy had reorganized the remnants of the old Army of Catalonia into three divisions under Eroles, Milans del Bosch, and Sarsfield, albeit with each containing only four or five battalions. On 4 October the Ultonia Regiment, under Lacy, took Igualada and that month his troops broke the line of garrisons the French needed to keep the road from Barcelona to Lerida open.

==== 1812 ====
The regiment saw action under Lacy at San Feliú de Codina (27 January) and the following month again invaded France, sacking several villages in the Auch region. Back in Catalonia, they fought at Molins de Rey (26 May), at La Llacuna and again at Montblanc, Spain (7–8 September), while their companies of grenadiers and chasseurs attacked the fortress at Mataró.

Brought together again as one unit, the regiment attacked the French forces at San Vicente de la Llavanera and at other locations.

==== 1813 ====
In mid-May, under General Copons, appointed captain-general of Catalonia at the end of 1812, the regiment took part in the victory at Battle of La Bisbal (La Bisbal) and in July at another victory "on the fields of La Salud", (Note: It is unclear whther Clonard (1857) is referring to what is now the district of La Salut (Barcelona), but at the time agricultural land outside the city, or to La Salud (Badalona) or La Salut (Sabadell).) as part of the division commanded by General Felipe Fleyres.

==== 1814 ====
Still only made up of one battalion, with 854 men, the Ultonia took part in the siege of Lleida until it was taken by Eroles (February) and then went on to do the same at Barcelona, until the armistice, upon which it became part of the garrison there.

== Post-war ==
In 1815, the Ultonia Regiment was again brought together as three battalions, with the Regiment of Alpujarras (2,400 men in two battalions), that had been raised in Granada in 1808, becoming the 2nd Battalion of the Ultonia Regiment, and the Regiment of the Leales Manresanos (1,947 men), that had been raised in Catalonia in 1811, becoming the 3rd Battalion.

== Disbandment ==
The major reform of Spain's army carried out in 1818 led to the foreign regiments, as well as those with foreign names, including the three "Irish" regiments, being disbanded. The Ultonia Regiment was merged into other regiments as follows: the 1st Battalion was incorporated into the Burgos Regiment, the 2nd Battalion into the Castilla Volunteer Regiment, and the 3rd Battalion into the Granada Regiment.

== Colonels of the regiment ==
Following Demetrio MacAulif, other colonels of the regiment included the following:

- Guillermo Creagh, father of Juan José Creagh
- Juan Antonio de Fábregues-Boixar
- Joaquín Gramberg (Grambell?).
- Jean de Kindelan, having risen to lieutenant general of the Irlanda Regiment, was transferred to the Ultonia Regiment to become its colonel in 1794
- Vicente McGrath
- Enrique O'Donnell, Conde de La Bisbal
- Pedro Sarsfield
- John Sherlock (Juan Sckerlock)

== Officers and other ranks mentioned in the historiography ==
- Cabral de Noroña, Miguel: Chaplain
- Chacón, José Nicolás (1817–1818)
- Creagh, Juan José: son of the Colonel of the Regiment, Guillermo Creagh
- Lacy, Luis de
- Lacy y Gould, Patricio de (sargento mayor): father of Luis de Lacy
- Macarti/Macarty, Ricardo (lieutenant colonel and sargento mayor), killed at Girona
- Macdonell, Enrique: briefly Minister of the Almirantazgo, the Spanish Admiralty (1817).
- McGrath, Vicente: awarded a gold medal for his service at the Battle of El Pla
- Makanti, Eduardo (sargento mayor): at Girona
- Marshal, Rudolfo (lieutenant colonel): at siege of Sant Feliu de Guixols, killed at Girona.
- Nash, William (colonel): at Girona (1809)
- O'Daly, Peter (lieutenant colonel): at Girona and governor of the garrison at Rosas
- O'Donovan, Juan (major, 3rd battalion): at Girona. Led a column at the combat at Sant Cugat del Vallès on 12 October 1808 (See also Battle of Cardedeu)
- O'Reilly, Joaquín (lieutenant colonel): at Girona
- Osorio/Ossorio? (captain): wounded on the line somewhere on the line between Canfranc and Irún in the western Pyrenees (possibly at one of the actions during the Battle of the Pyrenees)
- O'Sullivan, Daniel (captain): governor of Hostalrich; as a colonel, led the vanguard at the action at Manresa, 31 March 1811.
- O'Sullivan, Manuel (captain): at Hostalrich
- Roth, Juan Miguel (sargento mayor)
- Wavell. Arthur Goodall (lieutenant colonel): skirmishes at Casas Viejas (1811), Battles of Battle of BarrocaBarrosa (1811), where he was aide-de-camp to Pedro Sarsfield, defence of Tarragona (1813).

== See also ==
- Spanish Army (Peninsular War)
- Flight of the Earls
- Flight of the Wild Geese
