= Flight of the Wild Geese =

Departure of the Irish Jacobite army in 1691

The Flight of the Wild Geese was the departure of an Irish Jacobite army under the command of Patrick Sarsfield from Ireland to France, as agreed in the Treaty of Limerick on 3 October 1691, following the end of the Williamite War in Ireland. More broadly, the term Wild Geese is used in Irish history to refer to Irish soldiers who left to serve in continental European armies in the 16th, 17th and 18th centuries.

An earlier exodus in 1690, during the same war, had formed the French Irish Brigade, who are sometimes misdescribed as Wild Geese.

== The Flight in 1691 ==
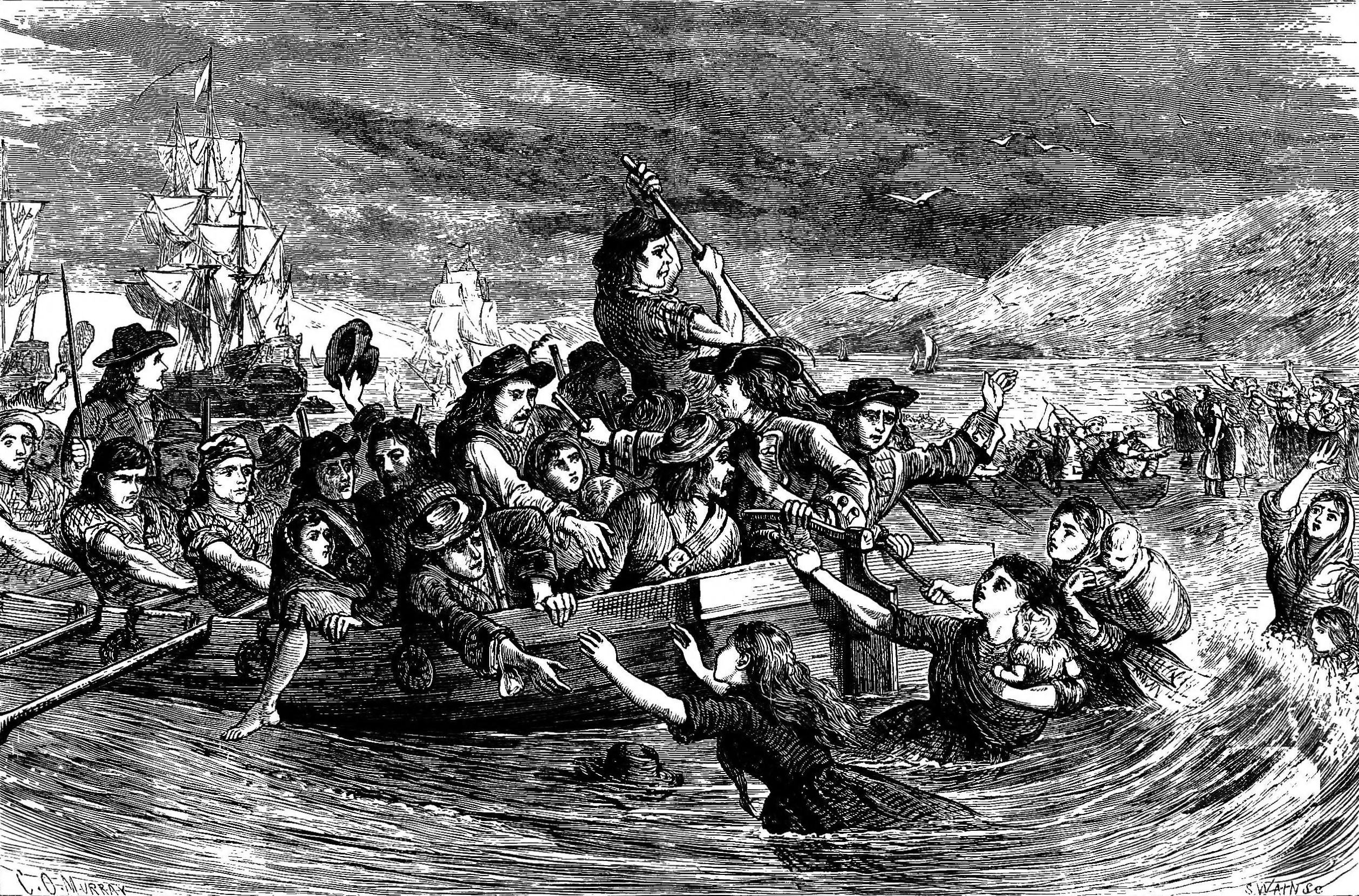
A depiction by Charles Oliver Murray of Irish Jacobite soldiers leaving Limerick amidst chaotic scenes in 1691

Following the costly defeats suffered by James II's Jacobite forces at the battles of the Boyne (July 1690) and Aughrim (July 1691), the remaining Jacobite forces made a final stand at the walled city of Limerick, where a siege began in August 1691. Surrounded, under heavy bombardment and cut off from French naval support, Sarsfield initiated negotiations which resulted in the surrender of Jacobite forces on favourable terms in October through the Treaty of Limerick.

The treaty contained military articles designed to permanently remove the Jacobite combatant threat from Ireland, with Jacobite soldiers in formed regiments being given three explicit options:

- Swear an oath of allegiance to William III of England and return home, remaining in Ireland;
- Enlist in the Williamite army;
- Accept transport to France with their arms and flags to continue service to James II under Louis XIV.

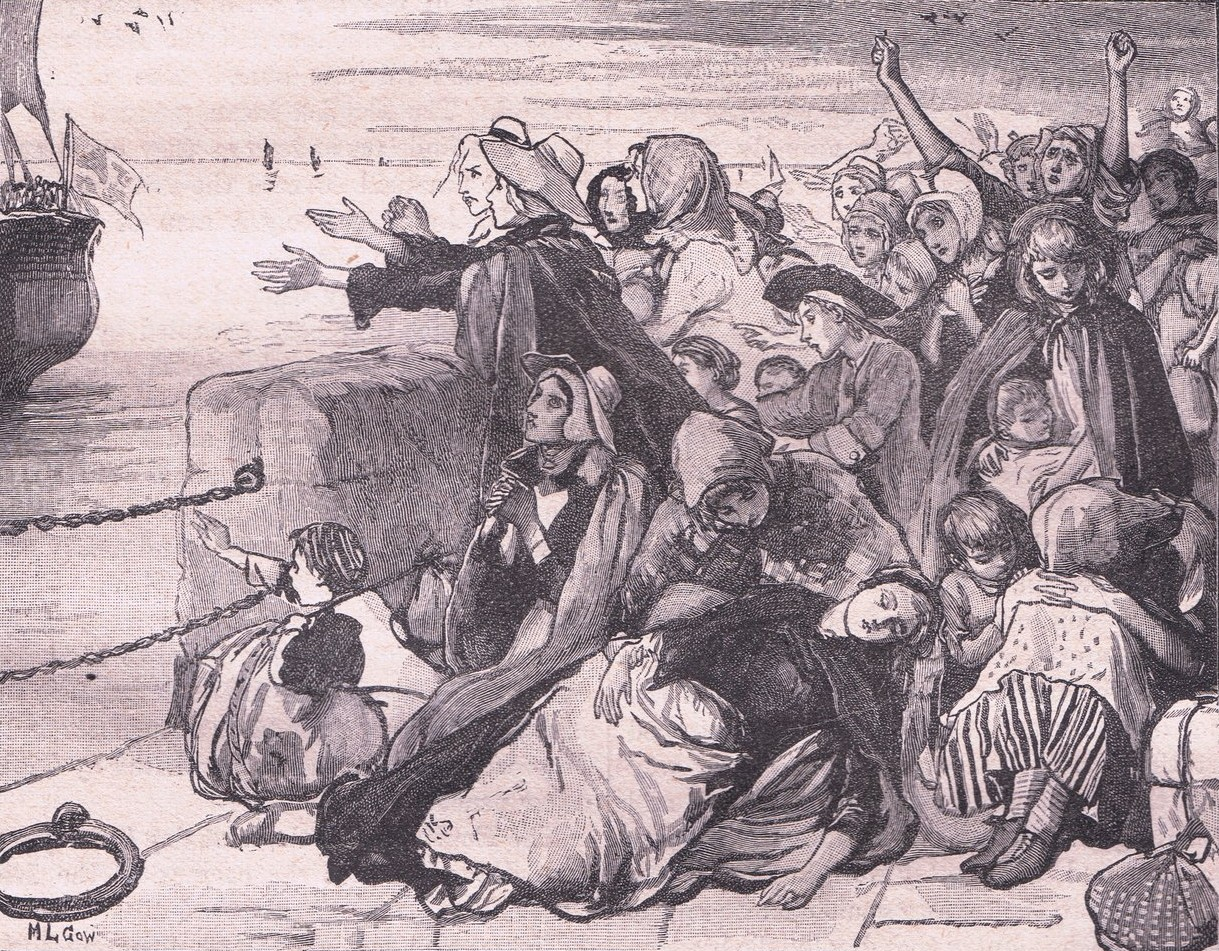
A depiction of women and children on the quay at Limerick while the Irish Jacobite soldiers depart for France

Contrary to the expectations of the Williamite authorities, over 14,000 Jacobite soldiers chose the option of transport and exile rather than accepting submission to William III. These soldiers were accompanied by approximately 4–6,000 wives, children and other camp followers. Between October and December 1691, French warships and other chartered transport vessels provided by the English arrived in Limerick and Cork to evacuate the Jacobites.

Transport capacity was insufficient, leading to officers strictly limiting the number of non-combatants who boarded the ships. Contemporary accounts described frantic scenes on the quays and harbours as family members attempted to join their relatives on the transport. Sarsfield himself sailed to France on 22 December 1691. In a poem two centuries later, W. B. Yeats would mourn:

Was it for this the Wild Geese spread
A grey wing on every tide...

After leaving Ireland, most of the vessels landed in the French ports of Brest and Rochefort. Most of the soldiers were then initially kept together in Normandy ready to participate in a planned invasion of England. This was abandoned after defeat at the Battles of Barfleur and La Hougue in 1692. Distrusting the Irish soldiers and considering them too unreliable, Louis François Marie Le Tellier ordered that the soldiers then be scattered across the other theatres of the Nine Years' War.

== Service by country ==
=== Spanish service ===
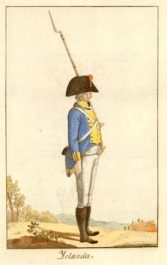
Picture displaying the uniform of the Regimiento de Infantería Irlanda

The first Irish troops to serve as a unit for a continental power formed an Irish regiment in the Spanish Army of Flanders in the Eighty Years' War in the 1590s. The regiment had been raised by an English Catholic, William Stanley, in Ireland from native Irish soldiers and mercenaries, whom the English authorities wanted out of the country. (See also Tudor conquest of Ireland). Stanley was given a commission by Elizabeth I and was intended to lead his regiment on the English side, in support of the Dutch United Provinces. However, in 1585, motivated by religious factors and bribes offered by the Spaniards, Stanley defected to the Spanish side with the regiment. In 1598 Diego Brochero de Anaya wrote to the Spanish King Philip III:

that every year Your Highness should order to recruit in Ireland some Irish soldiers, who are people tough and strong, and nor the cold weather or bad food could kill them easily as they would with the Spanish, as in their island, which is much colder than this one, they are almost naked, they sleep on the floor and eat oats bread, meat and water, without drinking any wine.

The unit fought in the Netherlands until 1600 when it was disbanded due to heavy wastage through combat and sickness.

Following the defeat of the Gaelic armies of the Nine Years' War, the "Flight of the Earls" took place in 1607. The Earl of Tyrone Hugh O'Neill, the Earl of Tyrconnell Rory O'Donnell and the Lord of Beare and Bantry, Donal O'Sullivan, along with many chiefs, Gallowglass, and their followers from Ulster, fled Ireland. They hoped to get Spanish help in order to restart their rebellion in Ireland, but King Philip III of Spain did not want a resumption of war with England and refused their request.

Nevertheless, their arrival led to the formation of a new Irish regiment in Flanders, officered by Gaelic Irish nobles and recruited from their followers and dependents in Ireland. This regiment was more overtly political than its predecessor in Spanish service and was militantly hostile to English Protestant rule of Ireland. The regiment was led by Hugh O'Neill's son John. Prominent officers included Owen Roe O'Neill and Hugh Dubh O'Neill.

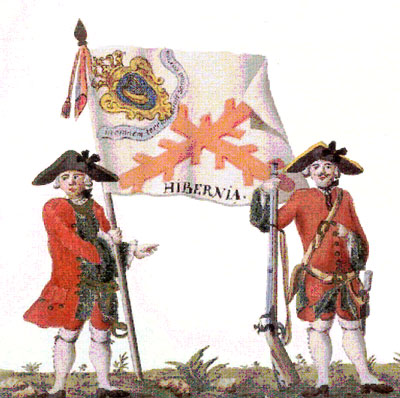
Uniform and colonel's flag of the Regiment of Hibernia in Spanish service, mid-eighteenth century

A fresh source of recruits came in the early 17th century, when Roman Catholics were banned from military and political office in Ireland. As a result, the Irish units in the Spanish service began attracting Catholic Old English officers such as Thomas Preston and Garret Barry. These men had more pro-English views than their Gaelic counterparts and animosity was created over plans to use the Irish regiment to invade Ireland in 1627. The regiment was garrisoned in Brussels during the truce in the Eighty Years' War from 1609 to 1621 and developed links with Irish Catholic clergy based in the seminary there, creating the Irish Colleges – including Florence Conroy.

Many of the Irish troops in Spanish service returned to Ireland after the Irish Rebellion of 1641 and fought in the armies of Confederate Ireland – a movement of Irish Catholics. When the Confederates were defeated and Ireland occupied after the Cromwellian conquest of Ireland, around 34,000 Irish Confederate troops fled the country to seek service in Spain. Some of them later deserted or defected to French service, where the conditions were deemed better.

During the 18th century, Spain's Irish regiments saw service not only in Europe but also in the Americas. As examples, the Irlanda Regiment (raised 1698) was stationed in Havana from 1770 to 1771, the Ultonia Regiment (raised 1709) in Mexico from 1768 to 1771, and the Regiment of Hibernia (raised 1709) in Honduras from 1782 to 1783.

At the time of the Napoleonic Wars all three of these Irish infantry regiments still formed part of the Spanish army. Heavy losses and recruiting difficulties diluted the Irish element in these units, although the officers remained of Irish ancestry. The Hibernia Regiment had to be reconstituted with Galician recruits in 1811 and ended the war as an entirely Spanish corps. All three regiments were finally disbanded in 1818 on the grounds that insufficient recruits, whether Irish or other foreigners, were forthcoming.

=== French service ===
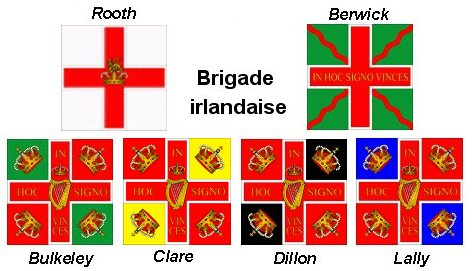
Flags of the Irish regiments in French service

From the mid-17th century or so, France overtook Spain as the destination for Catholic Irishmen seeking a military career. The reasons for this included the increased overlap between French and Irish interests, and the ease of migration to France and Flanders from Ireland.

France recruited many foreign soldiers during various periods; Germans, Italians, Irish, Scottish and Swiss. André Corvisier, the authority on French military archives, estimates that foreigners accounted for around 12% of all French troops in peacetime and 20% of troops during warfare. In common with the other foreign troops the Irish regiments were paid more than their French counterparts. Both Irish and Swiss regiments in French service wore red uniforms, though this had no connection with the redcoats of the British army.

The crucial turning point came during the Williamite War in Ireland (1688–91), when Louis XIV gave military and financial aid to the Irish Jacobites. In 1690, in return for 6,000 French troops that were shipped to Ireland, Louis demanded 6,000 Irish recruits for use in the Nine Years' War against the Dutch. Five regiments, led by Justin McCarthy, Viscount Mountcashel formed the nucleus of Mountcashel's French Irish Brigade. A year later, after the Irish Jacobites under Patrick Sarsfield agreed to favourable peace terms and capitulated at the Treaty of Limerick in 1691, the fully armed and equipped Irish Army withdrew to France.

Sarsfield sailed to France on 22 December 1691, leading 19,000 of his countrymen and countrywomen to enter the French service in the first phase of the military denuding of Ireland. Sarsfield's exodus included 14,000 soldiers and around 6,000 women and children. This event began what is remembered in Ireland as the Flight of the Wild Geese.

Sarsfield's Irish army was regrouped and equipped in their red coats, symbolizing their allegiance to the Stuart king. In 1692, a large Franco-Irish army had assembled on the French coast for an invasion of England, but the proposed invasion was scuppered due to the French naval defeat at Battles of Barfleur and La Hogue. Sarsfield's Wild Geese were then re-grouped on the same footing as Mountcashel's Irish Brigade.

Up until 1745, the Catholic Irish gentry were allowed to discreetly recruit soldiers for French service. The authorities in Ireland saw this as preferable to the potentially disruptive effects of having large numbers of unemployed young men of military age in the country. However, after a composite Irish detachment from the French Army (drawn from each of the regiments comprising the Irish Brigade and designated as "Irish Picquets") was used to support the Jacobite rising of 1745, the British authorities realised the dangers of this policy and banned recruitment for foreign armies in Ireland. After this point, the rank and file of the Irish units in French service were increasingly non-Irish, although the officers continued to be recruited from Ireland.

During the Seven Years' War efforts were made to find recruits from among Irish prisoners of war or deserters from the British Army. Otherwise, recruitment was limited to a trickle of Irish volunteers who were able to make their own way to France, or from the sons of former members of the Irish Brigade who had remained in France. During the Seven Years' War, the Irish Regiments in French service were: Bulkeley, Clare, Dillon, Rooth, Berwich and Lally. Additionally, there was a regiment of cavalry: Fitzjames. By the end of the 18th century, even the officers of the Irish Regiments were drawn from Franco-Irish families who had settled in France for several generations. While often French in all but name, such families retained their Irish heritages.

Following the outbreak of the French Revolution, the Irish Brigade ceased to exist as a separate entity on 21 July 1791 when the 12 non-Swiss foreign regiments then in existence were integrated into the line infantry of the French Army. Although the remaining Irish regiments: Dillon's, Berwick's and Walsh's, lost their distinctive red uniforms and separate status, they were still known informally by their traditional titles. Many individual Franco-Irish officers left the service in 1792 when Louis XVI was deposed, as their oath of loyalty was to him and not to the French nation.

In 1803 Napoleon Bonaparte raised a light infantry Irish unit composed mainly of veterans of the Irish Rebellion of 1798. Napoleon's Irish Legion originally comprised one under-strength battalion but it was later raised to a regiment comprising four battalions and a regimental depot or headquarters. The Legion was designated as a distinctly Irish unit from its establishment. The intention was that the Legion would spearhead an invasion of Ireland, supported by French troops. The unit was dressed in emerald-green uniforms faced with gold and received their regimental colour of a gold harp in each corner on a green background inscribed with "Le Premier Consul aux Irlandos Uni" ("The First Consul to United Ireland") and on the obverse; "Liberte des Conscience/Independence d'Irlande" ("Freedom of Conscience/Independence to Ireland"). In December 1804 they received a new Colour and Napoleon's cherished bronze-cast Imperial Eagle. Many officers from the ancien régime Irish Brigade also joined the unit, where it gained distinction in the Walcheren Expedition in the Low Countries and during the Peninsular War, in particular during the Siege of Astorga (1812) where an Irish detachment of elite voltigeurs formed the "forlorn hope" and led the assault battalion, comprising the 47th Regiment of the Line, which stormed through the breach, taking cover all night under heavy fire inside the city's walls. By morning the defenders surrendered as they were out of ammunition. The last significant action involving the unit was during the siege of Antwerp in 1814, when the Irish Legion defended the city for three months against an Anglo-Prussian force which had landed in the Low Countries to defeat Napoleon. The siege was lifted after Napoleon's abdication and the unit was shortly afterwards disbanded, ending a 125-year-old Irish military tradition in France.

=== Italian service ===
Despite being less studied, the ancient and traditional "mestiere delle armi" in Italy was also a well-known profession by the Irish. The "tercio" of Lucas Taf (around 500 men) served in Milan towards 1655. The Army of Savoy included also Irishmen, but in Italy, the Irish were organized basically by the Spanish administration. In 1694, another regiment in Milan was exclusively composed of Irishmen. Around 3–4% of a total of 20,000 men were Irish in the Spanish Army of Milan. It is not a high figure, but it was important as regards quality. In this context, James Francis Fitz-James Stuart (1696–1739), Duke of Berwick and of Liria is just one example of this success. He began to serve the monarchy in 1711 and succeeded in becoming General Lieutenant (1732), ambassador in Russia, in Austria and in Naples, where he died. In 1702, an Irish grenadier company led by Francis Terry entered Venetian service. This company of Jacobite exiles served at Zara until 1706. Colonel Terry became the Colonel of a Venetian Dragoon Regiment, which the Terry family mostly commanded until 1797. Colonel Terry's Dragoons uniforms were red-faced blue in the Irish tradition. The Limerick Regiment, of Irish Jacobites, transferred from Spanish service to that of the Bourbon king of Sicily in 1718.

=== Austrian service ===
Throughout this period, there were also substantial numbers of Irish officers and men in the armies or service of European powers, including the Austrian Habsburg Empire. It was not uncommon for Irish commanders of the Habsburg Empire to encounter enemy armies led by other Irishmen. One such example was Peter Lacy, a field marshal in the Imperial Russian Army, whose son Franz excelled in the Austrian service. General Maximilian Ulysses Browne, the Austrian commanding officer in the Battle of Lobositz, was also of Irish descent. Recruitment for Austrian service included areas of the midlands of Ireland, and members of the Taaffe, O'Neill and Wallis families served with Austria. Count Alexander O'Nelly (O'Neill), who came from Ulster, commanded the 42nd Bohemian Infantry Regiment from 1734 to 1743. Much earlier, in 1634, during the Thirty Years' War, Irish officers led by Walter Deveraux assassinated general Albrecht von Wallenstein on the orders of the Emperor. In the late 18th and throughout the 19th century, further Irish officers served in the Habsburg Empire, so Andreas O'Reilly von Ballinlough (1742–1832), whose military service extended through the Seven Years' War, the War of the Bavarian Succession, the Austro-Turkish War, the French Revolutionary Wars, and the Napoleonic Wars, furthermore Laval Graf Nugent von Westmeath and Maximilian Graf O’Donnell von Tyrconnell, who saved the life of Emperor Franz Joseph I during an assassination attempt. Gottfried von Banfield finally became the most successful Austro-Hungarian naval aeroplane pilot in the First World War.

=== Swedish and Polish service ===
In 1609, Arthur Chichester, then Lord Deputy of Ireland, deported 1,300 former rebel Irish soldiers from Ulster to serve in the Protestant Swedish Army. However, under the influence of Catholic clergy, many of them deserted to Polish service.

The Catholic Irish troops in Protestant Swedish service changed sides during the Battle of Klushino, against largely Catholic Poland, the only European country with statutory freedom of religion at the time. The Irish then served in Polish service for several years during the Polish–Muscovite War (1605–1618), until their wages went unpaid.

== End of the Wild Geese ==
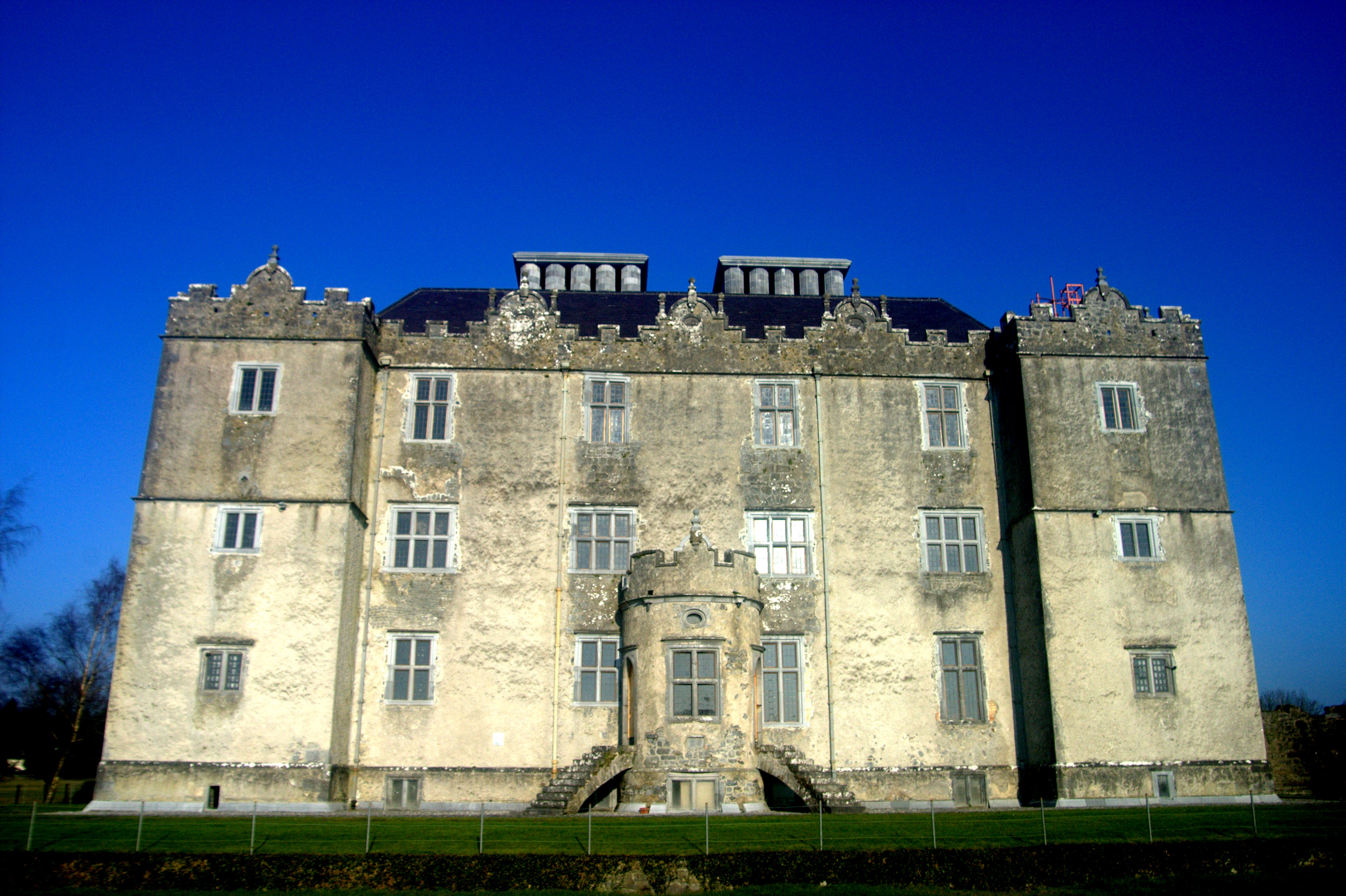
Portumna castle, the location of the Wild Geese heritage museum

Irish recruitment for continental armies declined sharply after it was made illegal in 1745. In practical terms, this meant that recruiting within Ireland itself effectively ceased, and Irishmen seeking employment in foreign armies had to make their own way to the Continent. Replacements accordingly were drawn increasingly from the descendants of Irish soldiers who had settled in France or Spain; from non-Irish foreign recruits such as more readily available Germans or Swiss; or from natives of the recruiting countries.

In 1732, Sir Charles Wogan indicated in a letter to Dean Swift that 120,000 Irishmen had been killed and wounded in foreign service "within these forty years", with Swift later replying:

I cannot but highly esteem those gentlemen of Ireland who, with all the disadvantages of being exiles and strangers, have been able to distinguish themselves by their valour and conduct in so many parts of Europe, I think, above all other nations.

As noted above, as late as the late 1780s, there were still three Irish regiments in France. During the Napoleonic Wars at least nominally Irish units continued to serve in the Spanish and French armies. At the time of the Franco-Prussian War a volunteer Irish medical unit, the Franco-Irish Ambulance Brigade, was serving with the French Army.

It was some time before the British armed forces began to tap into Irish Catholic manpower. In the late 18th century, the Penal Laws were gradually relaxed and in the 1790s the laws prohibiting Catholics from bearing arms were abolished. Thereafter, the British began recruiting Irish regiments for the Crown Force – including for such units as the Connaught Rangers. Several more Irish-labelled units were created in the 19th century. By 1914 infantry regiments in the British Army that were associated with Ireland included the Prince of Wales's Leinster Regiment, the Royal Dublin Fusiliers, the Irish Guards, the Royal Irish Regiment, the Royal Inniskilling Fusiliers, the Royal Irish Rifles, the Royal Irish Fusiliers, the Connaught Rangers and the Royal Munster Fusiliers.

With the creation of the Irish Free State in 1922, five of the above regiments were disbanded, with most of the remainder undergoing a series of amalgamations between 1968 and 2006. The United Kingdom still retains four Irish-named regiments: the Irish Guards, the Royal Irish Regiment, the Scottish and North Irish Yeomanry, and the London Irish Rifles. The Queen's Royal Hussars, the successor regiment of the Queen's Royal Irish Hussars, and the Royal Dragoon Guards, the successor regiment of the 4th Royal Irish Dragoon Guards and the 5th Royal Inniskilling Dragoon Guards, maintain the Irish heritage of their antecedent regiments through their uniforms, regimental bands and traditions, such as the celebration of St. Patrick's Day.

== Other use ==
The term "Wild Geese" is sometimes used metaphorically to refer to Irish emigrants. This usage can be seen, for example in The Irish Times, which has a recurrent section called Wild Geese in which "Irish people working abroad tell their stories".

== See also ==
- 5 Commando (Democratic Republic of the Congo)
- Battle of Pensacola (1781)
- Count Joseph Cornelius O’Rourke
- Early Modern Ireland 1536–1691
- Flight of the Earls
- Great Britain in the Seven Years' War
- Ireland 1691–1801
- Saint Patrick's Battalion
- The Wild Geese
