= Franco-Irish Ambulance Brigade =

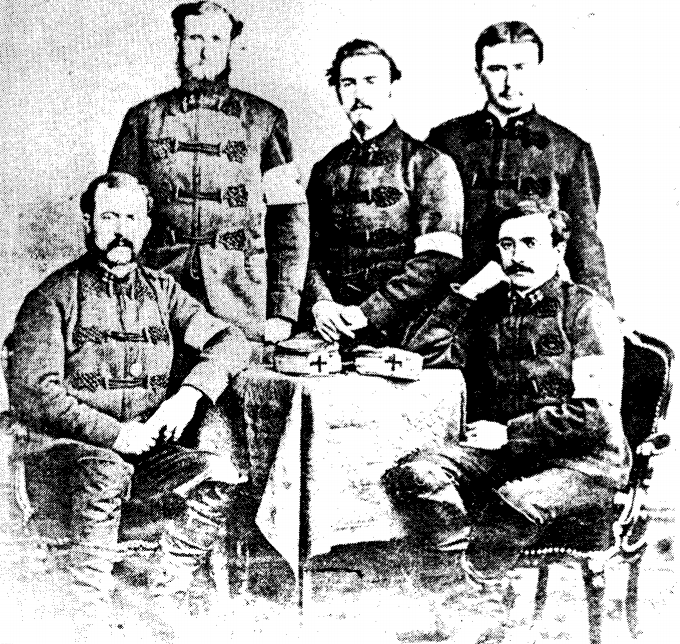
- Members of the brigade in uniform
- Active: 1870–71
- Country: Ireland
- Allegiance: Second French Empire
- Role: Medical support
- Size: 281 men initially
- Nickname: Ambulance Irlandais
- Engagements: Franco-Prussian War

Commanders
- Surgeon-in-Command: Dr Charles P Baxter

The Franco-Irish Ambulance Brigade (known in French as the Ambulance Irlandais) was a volunteer medical corps sent from Ireland to assist the French Army in the 1870–71 Franco-Prussian War. At the time Ireland was part of the United Kingdom of Great Britain and Ireland and parliament had passed the Foreign Enlistment Act 1870 which, in most circumstances, prohibited British citizens from enlisting in foreign armies. As a non-combatant force the ambulance brigade was not covered by the act. Around 280 men joined the brigade which arrived in France in early October 1870. They served with the French armies of the North and of the Loire until the signing of the armistice in January 1871. The unit was controversial as only a minority of the men who enlisted were retained for ambulance service, with many choosing instead to fight in the French Foreign Legion. The British government investigated the unit for breaches of the 1870 act but no prosecutions were brought.

== Formation ==
After a period of increasing tension between the two great powers France declared war on Prussia on 19 July 1870. The nation of Ireland had a long history of service in the French Army. The Wild Geese fought for France in the 17th and 18th centuries and Irishmen joined the Papal Brigade to garrison the Vatican in 1860 to deter annexation by Italy following the Second Italian War of Independence. Ireland in 1870 was a part of the United Kingdom of Great Britain and Ireland and as such was officially neutral during the Franco-Prussian War. The British government, concerned about becoming entangled in the war on the continent passed the Foreign Enlistment Act 1870 which forbade British citizens from enlisting in the army of a nation which was at war with any nation with which the UK was at peace. Despite this a popular subscription was started in Ireland on 13 August to raise money for the treatment of wounded French soldiers. On 7 September the Committee for the Relief of the Sick and Wounded of the French Army and Navy was founded in Dublin, under the leadership of Father Tom Burke. The committee decided to raise a medical corps to serve alongside the French armed forces which, as a non-combatant unit, would not contravene the Foreign Enlistment Act.

Recruitment of volunteers proved relatively easy and soon 31 surgeons and 250 men had joined the brigade which was commanded by Dr Charles P Baxter, a former assistant surgeon with the 93rd Sutherland Highlanders. The unit comprised five companies commanded by a surgeon (a trained doctor) each of which had four sections led by an assistant surgeon (a medical student). Five ambulance wagons, tentage and bedding were also supplied. The men of the unit had little experience or much in the way of military discipline. The unit paraded at Dublin's Rotunda Gardens on 8 October before marching to the docks to embark on the French vessel La Fontaine. The Dublin Metropolitan Police had ordered that no bands were to play on this occasion but this was ignored and numerous trades bands played from small boats in the harbour to the crowd of thousands who came to watch the embarkation.

By the time the unit had left Ireland the war was effectively already lost for the French. The French Army of Châlons was destroyed at the Battle of Sedan where Emperor Napoleon III was captured on 2 September; the Second French Empire fell two days later. The Franco-Irish Ambulance Brigade arrived at Le Havre on 11 October where it joined the army of the French Third Republic which continued the war with Prussia. The disembarkation was marked by a parade of the French garrison, during which the bands played and full military honours were rendered to the Irish volunteers.

== War service ==
Shortly after arrival Baxter determined that he had too many men for the number of ambulance wagons available and released all bar 100 of the volunteers. The majority of the men released stayed in France to form La Compagnie Irlandaise (The Irish Company) of the 2nd Foreign Infantry Regiment, a combatant unit led by Irishman Martin Waters Kirwan, formerly of the Glamorganshire Light Infantry Militia. A second Irish ambulance unit was raised in London but was turned away upon arrival at Caen as no arrangements had been made with the French authorities to accept it. Some reinforcements seem to have been accepted from Irishmen already in France including JJ O'Scanlon a merchant based at Le Havre. Additional support was provided by female volunteer nurses, nuns and convalescing soldiers.

Baxter's brigade was initially sent to serve with Colonel Mocquard's corps at Évreux. Upon arrival the brigade immediately went into action treating the wounded from a battle at Pacy-sur-Eure, three days prior, there being no French doctors available. After this the corps saw little action and Baxter complained that his men were underemployed. The brigade was subsequently divided with one part attached to the Army of the North and another to the Army of the Loire. The brigade subsequently served on the battlefield recovering the wounded and bringing them to casualty clearing stations run by the ambulance where treatments included a large number of amputations and bloodletting by leeches.

Upon arrival the detachment with the Army of the Loire was caught up in a crossfire Châteaudun and subsequently established a 60-bed hospital in preparation for the First Battle of Orleans, during which stretcher bearers were sent to the front lines. The brigade relocated to Patay on 22 November where a battle was fought shortly afterwards. The brigade moved hundreds of French wounded from there to the hospital at Châteaudun. The brigade ran out of funds at this point and subsequently Baxter paid the men's 2.5 francs per day allowance from his own pocket.

The brigade treated the wounded from 2 December Battle of Loigny–Poupry, after which they retreated back to Châteaudun ahead of the advancing Prussians. Following the loss of Vendôme and the harsh winter the morale of the detachment was low. They spent Christmas Day at Châteaudun before witnessing General Antoine Chanzy's defeat at the Battle of Le Mans on 12 January which effectively destroyed the army.

The detachment with the Army of the North also seems to have seen some action. During a cavalry skirmish at Buchy on 4 December one of the brigade's men, an assistant surgeon by the name of Ryan, was taken prisoner by the Prussians. He demanded release as a non-combatant before escaping on a Prussian officer's horse. He claimed to have escaped an attempt to recapture him by four Prussian soldiers, shooting two before making his escape to Honfleur.

== Disbandment and legacy ==
Shortly after the destruction of the Army of the Loire the French authorities issued orders to the Franco-Irish Ambulance Brigade releasing them from their duties on 5 January 1871. Men of both divisions travelled to Châteaudun where they were reunited for the first time in ten weeks, others headed straight to Le Havre to board ships headed for Ireland and some remained in France to enlist in the French Army. British consuls in France assisted the men of the brigade in returning home and provided transportation at British government expense. Men of the brigade who remained in France were later captured by Prussian forces who viewed them with suspicion and imprisoned them as enemy combatants. The corps was officially discharged at a meeting of its Committee on 17 August 1871. In the course of the war the unit suffered only one death, a wagon driver named William Hopkins who died of smallpox in November. With 1870–71 being a cold winter the unit was spared the usual large-scale outbreaks of smallpox, typhoid and dysentery usually associated with campaigns in the field.

It has been alleged by some historians that the unit was partly raised as a means of bringing Irishmen to France to enlist in the army in contravention of the Foreign Enlistment Act. The British National Archives holds documents from the time that claim that only 40 of the brigade were taken into service as ambulance men and the remainder become soldiers or else returning home. A British police officer was sent to France to collect evidence relating to the breach of the 1870 act but no prosecutions were brought. The men of the brigade who served in La Compagnie Irlandaise fought well at Montbéliard and in the subsequent retreat to Besançon before the 28 January 1871 Armistice of Versailles brought hostilities to a close.

The unit is regarded as one of the first volunteer aid missions and is said to have set the template for future operations. The National Museum of Ireland holds memorabilia related to the brigade and its work.

In July 2019 James Fitzgerald Lombard received France’s highest honour, the Légion d’Honneur, for founding the corps.

== See also ==
- British ambulances in the Franco-Prussian War
