= Carlos O'Donnell =

Spanish military officer

Carlos (Charles) O'Donnell
- Born: 1772; Cádiz, Spain
- Died: 1830 (aged 57–58) Madrid, Spain
- Allegiance: Kingdom of Spain
- Branch: Infantry
- Rank: Captain General

Carlos Manuel O'Donnell y Anhetan, also known as Charles O'Donnell (1772–1830), was a Spanish general of Irish descent who commanded Spanish troops against Imperial France during the Peninsular War.

== Family ==
His father was Joseph O'Donnell the elder. Carlos's five brothers all fought in Spain's armies, and two of them, like Carlos, were also generals; Enrique (Henry) O'Donnell, 1st Count of la Bisbal and José.

His son, Leopoldo O'Donnell, would also become a general and was prime minister of Spain on three occasions between 1856 and 1866.

== Early career ==
In 1777, he joined the Regimiento de Irlanda as an under-age cadet at the age of five before going on to join the Regiment of Hibernia.

He was promoted to lieutenant in 1787 and for much of 1790 participated in operations to suppress the bandoleros.

== Peninsular War ==
In 1800, he was promoted to colonel and appointed teniente del rey (equivalent to the British lord-lieutenant) for Santa Cruz de Tenerife. Following the beginning of Spanish involvement in the Peninsular War in 1808, O'Donnell was appointed interim commander general of the Canary Islands when the Junta de Canarias dismissed the incumbent, General Fernando de Cagigal, after he had been accused of not supporting Fernando VII. The Junta Suprema de Sevilla later confirmed O'Donnell as the new commander general despite counter-accusations claiming that he had intended to declare the islands' independence with British support and that he had orchestrated the rumours regarding Cagigal's allegiance. Once his appointment was confirmed, in October 1808 he sent two Infantry battalions and two Artillery companies, plus numerous provisions, to mainland Spain. That same month, he was promoted to field marshal.

O'Donnell's request to be transferred to the mainland for active service in defending Spain was granted in June 1809. The following August he handed over his command to Field Marshal Carlos Luján and left for Cádiz shortly thereafter. He was given the command of the 2nd Infantry Division of the Ejército de la Izquierda, under Marquis de la Romana, and saw active service at Seville, in Portugal and in Extremadura.

In March 1810, he was able to break the siege of Cáceres but the following month, having deployed his troops along the right bank of the Guadiana, near Alburquerque, to protect the flank of the Anglo-Portuguese Army, his vanguard suffered many casualties when attacked by General Jean Reynier's troops. That October, the Ejército de la Izquierda was incorporated under the command of the Duke of Wellington, and O'Donnell participated in the defence of the Lines of Torres Vedras and the subsequent expulsion of Marshal André Masséna from Portugal. O'Donnell was wounded on several occasions during this period.

Following the death of General de la Romana, at the end of January 1811, O'Donnell requested to be transferred to Catalonia, where his brother Enrique, was captain general. However, he was instead appointed interim captain general of Valencia, post he was unable to take up until April. On 1 June 1811, as commanding officer of the 2nd Army, or Army of Valencia, he had under him, present under arms, a field army of 22,908 troops, including Juan Martín Díez's flying column of 3,220 men, plus the garrisons of Sagunto, Oropesa, Peniscola, which numbered an additional 1,999 men.
