= Zújar =

- Municipality of Spain
- Coat of arms

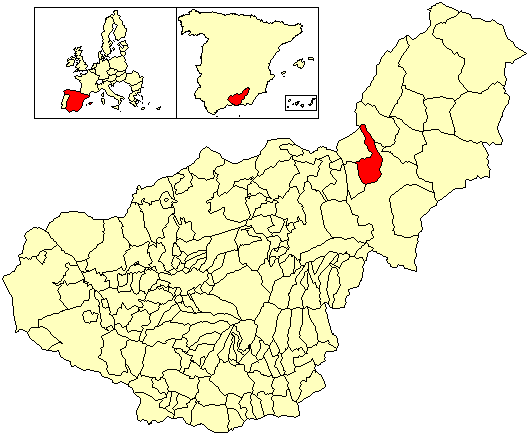
- Location of Zújar
- Coordinates: 37°32′N 2°50′W
- Country: Spain
- Province: Granada
- Municipality: Zújar

Area
  - Total: 102 km^{2} (39 sq mi)
- Elevation: 775 m (2,543 ft)

Population (2025-01-01)
  - Total: 2,655
  - Density: 26.0/km^{2} (67.4/sq mi)
- Time zone: UTC+1 (CET)
  - Summer (DST): UTC+2 (CEST)

Zújar is a municipality located in the province of Granada, Spain. According to the 2005 census (INE), the city has a population of 2746 inhabitants.

== See also ==
- List of municipalities in Granada
