= Hibernia Regiment (Spain) =

Infantry regiment of the Spanish Army

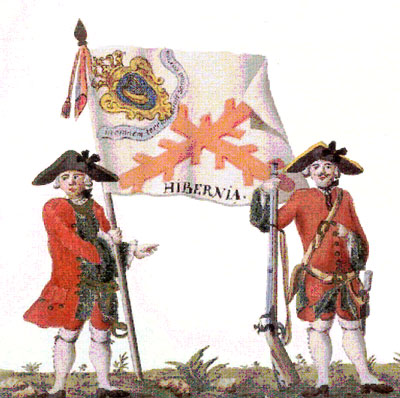
Uniform and colonel's flag of the Hibernia Regiment in Spanish service, mid-eighteenth century

The Hibernia Regiment was an infantry regiment of the Spanish Army. Known by many in Spain as "O'Neill's Regiment", it was formed in 1709 from Irishmen who fled their own country in the wake of the Williamite War in Ireland and the penal laws and who became known as the Wild Geese - a name which has become synonymous in modern times for Irish mercenaries and soldiers throughout the world.

Although the Wild Geese are more associated with the French Army and are indeed seen as the precursors of the French Foreign Legion the Hibernia regiment was one of many Irish regiments to serve in the Spanish army. The Wild Geese began fighting for Spain during the Eighty Years' War. The first Irish units in the service of Spain were formed in 1587 as the Tercio Irlanda ("Irish Tercio"), formed from defectors from the English army.

Due to the number of wars Spain was involved in during the early 18th century the country could not provide itself with enough soldiers for its own campaigns. This was also exacerbated by the severe loss of manpower as a result of a plague epidemic. Diplomatic approaches were made to a number of countries with requests for the recruitment of mercenaries to fight for Spain. Swiss, Germans, Italians and Walloons were recruited but the Spanish were particularly keen to engage Irishmen because of their reputation as soldiers. The Confederation of Kilkenny established licences for the recruitment of Irishmen to fight for the King of Spain.

The Irish regiments in Spanish service were disbanded in 1818 at the request of their British allies.

== Background ==
The three "Irish" regiments, like other units before them, such as the Irish Tercio](Tercio irlandés) (Note: Not to be confused with Irish Brigade of the French Royal Army, formed in May 1690, and also composed of Irish exiles, led by Lord Mountcashel.) which was raised in 1605 by Henry O'Neill to be incorporated into Spain's Army of Flanders, were raised from among the thousands of young Irishmen who, due to the Penal Laws, left their homes to take service with France and Spain.

The first of these regiments to be formed, Irlanda, was raised by levies in Ireland in 1638. The Hibernia Regiment was raised in 1703 (or 1709) by order of Philip V, from troops and officers from Spain's forces in France and Ultonia was raised later that same year. (Note: Other sources, such as Clark (2010) and Clonard (1857), give the date as 1709.)

Although the service records give no reasons for the transfers, there was a certain amount of mobility among the three sister regiments, which may have been due to the need to raise the number of men under arms before a specific military action. One notable case is that of Alejandro O'Reilly (1723-1794), who enlisted in the Hibernia Regiment in 1735 and worked his way up to lieutenant general (1767) before transferring to the Irlanda Regiment in 1772.

== Uniform ==
Illustration of a regimental private in 1806

The Irish regiments, as foreign troops, originally wore the same red jacket as the Swiss and Neapolitan troops in their service - except they had green facings. This was worn with an athwart (worn sideways) black bicorne hat for all ranks; enlisted men wore a red plume and officers wore a red cockade and fringed epaulets. Their regimental symbol was the Arms of Ireland - a gold harp on a sky blue field.

In 1806 the uniform was changed to a sky-blue coatee with yellow lining, turnbacks and trim worn with a white vest and breeches, perhaps to differentiate them from their red-coated British allies. The Regimiento Irlanda (Irlanda "Ireland" Regiment, raised in 1698) had a yellow collar and lapels and gold buttons; the Regimiento Hibernia (Hibernia Regiment, raised in 1709) had a sky blue collar, yellow lapels and silver buttons, and the Regimiento Ultonia (Ultonia "Ulster" Regiment, raised in 1709) had a yellow collar, sky blue lapels and silver buttons.

== Campaigns and battles ==
One facet of so many Irishmen fighting for opposing nations in Europe was that they occasionally faced each other as enemies on foreign battlefields. The Hibernia Regiment found itself in this position at the second siege of Badajoz in 1811, when they faced the Irish Legion under the command of the French.

- Battle of Saragossa (1710)
- Battle of Brihuega (1710)
- Battle of Villaviciosa (1710)
- Siege of Barcelona (1713–1714)
- Siege of Ceuta (1720–1721)
- South America (1777)
- Great Siege of Gibraltar (1779–1783)
- Siege of Pensacola (1781)

== Colonels of the regiment ==
- Barutell, Juan Antonio (1817–1818)
- O'Neill, Arturo

== Officers and other ranks mentioned in the historiography ==
- Alburquerque, Ramón: Commander of the 1st battalion (1817–1818)
- Fitzgerald (colonel): Mentioned in Queipo de Llano's History of the Rising, War and Revolution of Spain (1953 edition) as not having joined the uprising in Oviedo and being "undaunted" when faced with the prospect of being executed by a firing squad.
- Madrazo Escalera, Clemente: A court martial in 1819 (after the regiment had been disbanded) ordered him to be reinstated to his previous rank in the Hibernia Regiment. He later joined the Carlists and was promoted to brigadier in 1839.
- O'Donnell, Alejandro: son of Joseph O'Donnell y O'Donnell. Two of his brothers, Francisco O'Donnell and Henry O'Donnell, 1st Count of la Bisbal, also served with the Hibernia Regiment. As commander of the 3rd Battalion, after having defeated General Schwarz, Alejandro O'Donnell was captured at the Battle of Coruña and taken prisoner to France.
- O'Donnell, Francisco: enlisted as a child cadet, by 1805 he was a lieutenant in the sister regiment of Irlanda at Cádiz.
- O'Donnell, Henry (1st Count of la Bisbal)
- O'Neill O'Keefe, Tulio
- O'Reilly, Alejandro

Sandoval, Juan: lieutenant colonel (1817–1818)

- Wall, Ricardo

== Bibliography ==
- Irish Brigades Abroad, Stephen McGarry
- The Spanish Monarchy and Irish Mercenaries.- The Wild Geese in Spain 1618-68. (R.A. Stradling)
- The Irish Brigades in the Service of France, J.C. O'Callaghan.
- The Wild Geese, M. Hennessy
- The March of O'Sullivan Beare, L.J. Emerson.
- The O' Neills in Spain, Spanish Knights of Irish Origin, Destruction by Peace, Micheline Kerney Walsh. The Irish Sword, Vol 4-11
- The Wild Geese, Mark G. McLaughlin.
- Wild Geese in Spanish Flanders, 1582–1700, B. Jennings.
- Spain under the Habsburgs, John Lynch
- The Flight of the Earls, John McCavitt
