= Nicolas Godinot =

French general

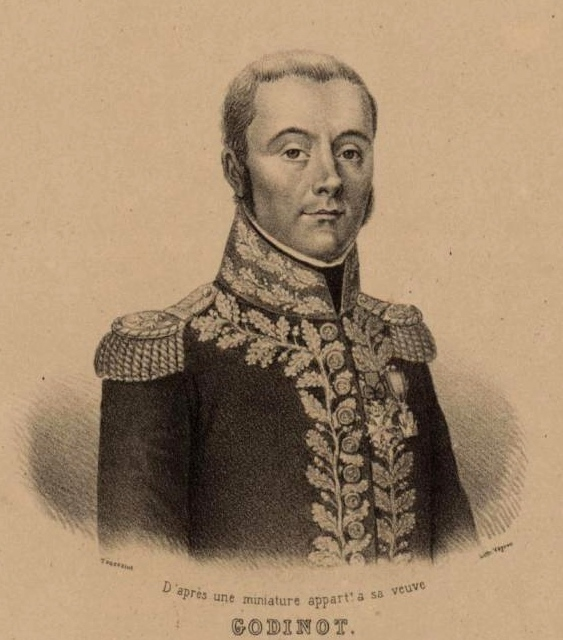
Nicolas Godinot

Deo-Gratias-Nicolas Godinot (1 May 1765 – 27 October 1811) was a général de division of the First French Empire who saw action during the Peninsular War. He was appointed chef de brigade of the 25th Légère on 30 June 1799 and rose to become Colonel of that regiment in 1803. Godinot gained promotion to général de brigade on 1 February 1805, and on 10 May 1811 rose further to général de division.

He led his brigade in a feint-attack against the village of Albuera during the Battle of Albuera on 16 May 1811. He defeated a Spanish force at the Battle of Zujar on 9 August 1811. Godinot was made the scapegoat for the Battle of Bornos, an operation that failed to trap Francisco Ballesteros in the autumn of 1811. Following a heated argument with Soult, Godinot killed himself.

Aside from his military rank, Godinot became a Commander of the Légion d'Honneur on 9 March 1806, and was made a Baron of the Empire on 27 July 1808.

== Bibliography ==
- Broughton, Tony (2002), French Light Infantry Regiments and the Colonels who Led Them: 1791 to 1815, The Napoleon Series;
