= Anne Gilbert de Laval =

French general

- Born: 9 November 1762; Riom, Auvergne, France
- Died: 6 September 1810 (aged 47) Mora de Rubielos, Spain
- Allegiance: France
- Branch: Infantry
- Rank: General of Division
- Conflicts: French Revolutionary Wars; Battle of Ettlingen; Battle of Neresheim; Battle of Friedberg; Battle of Biberach; Battle of Emmendingen; Battle of Schliengen; Siege of Kehl; First Battle of Zurich; Second Battle of Zurich; Battle of Stockach; Battle of Messkirch; Napoleonic Wars; Battle of Alcañiz; Battle of Belchite
- Other work: Baron of the Empire 1810

Anne Gilbert de Laval or Anne-Gilbert Laval or Anne Guilbert de La Val (French pronunciation: [an ʒilbɛʁ də laval]; 9 November 1762 – 6 September 1810) became a general officer during the French Revolutionary Wars and led a division in the Napoleonic Wars. Like many other officers, he saw rapid promotion during the French Revolution. He commanded a demi brigade beginning in 1794. He fought in numerous actions during the 1796 campaign in Germany, including the battles of Ettlingen and Neresheim.

In 1799 he was promoted to general of brigade shortly after the First Battle of Zurich. Afterward, he fought at Second Zurich, Stockach, and Messkirch. In 1808 he led a brigade in the invasion of Spain and was promoted to general of division the next year. He led a division under Louis Gabriel Suchet at Alcañiz and Belchite in 1809. He received a patent of nobility in June 1810 and died of fever at Mora de Rubielos a few months later. His surname is one of the Names inscribed under the Arc de Triomphe, on Column 36.

== Revolution ==
Laval was born on 9 November 1762 at Riom in the province of Auvergne, France. Today Riom is part of the Puy-de-Dôme department.

On 4 July 1794 Laval was promoted chef de brigade of the 103rd Line Infantry Demi Brigade. In the amalgame of 1796 the 103rd became part of the new 100th Line Infantry Demi Brigade. Laval assumed command of the 100th Line on 16 February 1796. In June 1796 the 100th Line was part of Guillaume Philibert Duhesme's division, which had 7,438 infantry and 895 cavalry. This formation belonged to Laurent Gouvion Saint-Cyr's Left Wing of Jean Victor Marie Moreau's Army of Rhin-et-Moselle. The demi brigade participated in a victory over Imperial troops at Renchen on 28 June. During Moreau's advance into southern Germany, Laval's troops were present at the battles of Ettlingen on 9 July 1796 Neresheim on 11 August, and Friedberg on 24 August. As the Army of Rhin-et-Moselle withdrew, it is probable that the 100th Line fought at the battles of Biberach on 2 October 1796, Emmendingen on 19 October, and Schliengen on 24 October. The 100th Demi Brigade served during the Siege of Kehl. This operation lasted from 10 November 1796 to 9 January 1797 when the French withdrew.

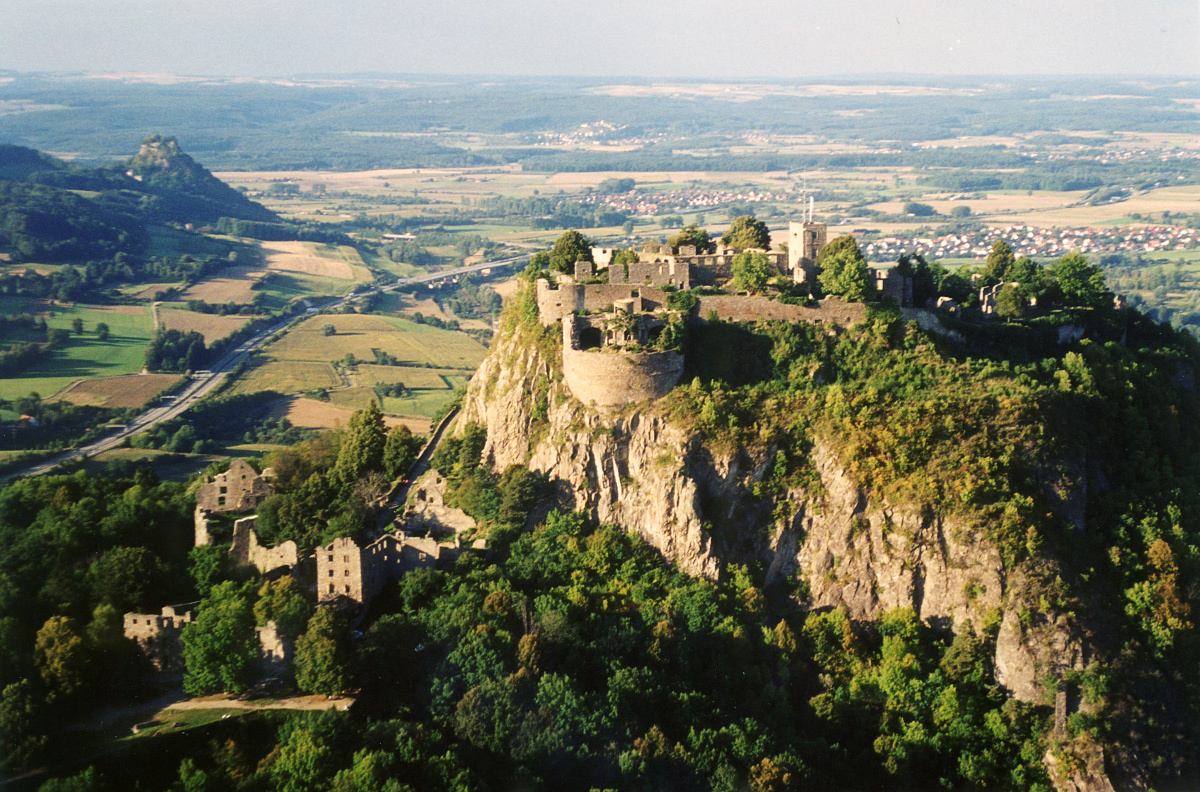
Ruins of Hohentwiel castle

One source showed Laval commanding a brigade at the battles of Ostrach and Stockach in March 1799, though this may be a mistaken identification of Jean François Leval.

On 4 June 1799, the 100th Demi Brigade fought in the 4th Division at the First Battle of Zurich. Laval was promoted to general of brigade less than a week later on 10 June 1799. At the Second Battle of Zurich on 25 and 26 September 1799, he led a brigade in Nicolas Soult's 3rd Division. Soult's 11,000 troops crossed the Linth River, surprising and defeating 13,000 Austrian and Russian defenders. The success resulted in the death of Austrian commander Friedrich Freiherr von Hotze and the severing of Alexander Suvarov's escape route. Under the command of Honoré Théodore Maxime Gazan, the 3rd Division participated in the unsuccessful effort to trap Suvarov's army in the Alps. From 30 September through 5 October, actions were fought at Klöntalersee, Muotathal, Näfels, and Schwanden.

In April 1800, Laval led a brigade in Moreau's Army of the Rhine. His division commander was Dominique Vandamme and the component units were the 1st Light Infantry and the 36th, 83rd, and 94th Line Infantry Demi Brigades, and the 8th Hussars. Vandamme's division belonged to Claude Lecourbe's Right Wing. Vandamme cowed the fortress of Hohentwiel into surrendering on 1 May 1800. Two days later, the division was in action at the Battle of Stockach. On 5 May, Vandamme's troops fought at the Battle of Messkirch. Laval missed the Battle of Hohenlinden on 3 December 1800. During the fall campaign, he led a brigade in Charles-Étienne Gudin's division of Lecourbe's Right Wing. On 14 December at Salzburg, the Austrian rear guard repulsed elements of Lecourbe's wing, including Gudin's division.

== Empire ==
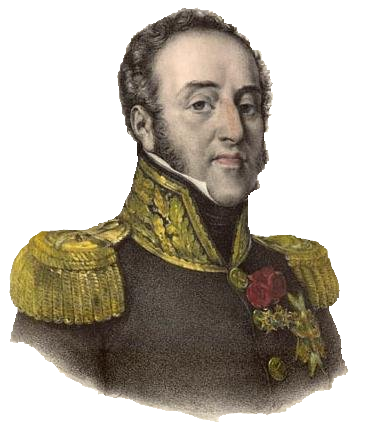
Louis Gabriel Suchet

By this time Napoleon Bonaparte made the poor decision to take Spain by force and replace King Charles IV. The French introduced 70,000 French troops into Spain and on 16 February 1808 seized control of a number of fortresses and cities. On 2 May 1808, the Spanish people rebelled against the French occupation forces, starting the Peninsular War. Laval and Claude Rosthollant were the brigade commanders in Bernard-Georges-François Frère's 3rd Division which belonged to Pierre Dupont de l'Étang's 2nd Corps of Observation of the Gironde. Frère's division included the 1,160-strong 15th Light Infantry Regiment, the 2,870-man 2nd Legion of Reserve, and the 1,174-strong 1st Battalion of the 2nd Swiss Infantry Regiment. The division was detached from the corps and did not share in the Bailén disaster. Instead Frère was sent from Madrid to reopen communications with Marshal Bon-Adrien Jeannot de Moncey's corps in its retreat after the Battle of Valencia. The two forces united on 8 July 1808 and withdrew to Madrid. Laval was promoted to general of division on 1 April 1809.

In May 1809, the III Corps in Spain received a new leader, Louis Gabriel Suchet. Laval assumed command of the 1st Division with 4,000 soldiers in eight battalions. The 2nd Division was led by Louis François Félix Musnier and the cavalry by Pierre Watier. Altogether, the corps mustered only 11,000 men. After the successful Siege of Zaragoza, the French overran the southern part of Aragon. Since war with Austria was looming, Napoleon withdrew half of Aragon's occupation troops leaving the French weak. The Spanish guerillas became active again, compelling the French to evacuate some districts. Soon, a Spanish army under General Joaquín Blake y Joyes appeared and threatened French control of Aragon.

Suchet attacked the Spanish army in the Battle of Alcañiz on 23 May 1809. The French army included 7,292 infantry in 14 battalions, 526 cavalry in six squadrons, and 18 artillery pieces. Blake's force was made up of 8,101 foot soldiers, 445 horsemen, and 19 guns. Laval's 1st Division counted two battalions each of the French 14th Line Infantry Regiment and the Polish 3rd Legion of the Vistula. Blake arrayed his troops on three hills in front of the town of Alcañiz. Laval made a tentative attack on the Spanish right flank, but it was driven off. Suchet then ordered Musnier to crack Blake's center. Musnier formed five of his battalions into a massed column and sent it marching toward Blake's line. After being pounded by all 19 Spanish guns and riddled by musketry, the French and Poles ran away. At this, the wounded Suchet withdrew his corps from the field. In the fighting, the III Corps lost 800 killed and wounded, while Blake suffered only 300 casualties. Suchet subsequently abandoned much of Aragon, while Blake received 25,000 new recruits. Luckily for the French, not enough muskets were available to supply them all with weapons.

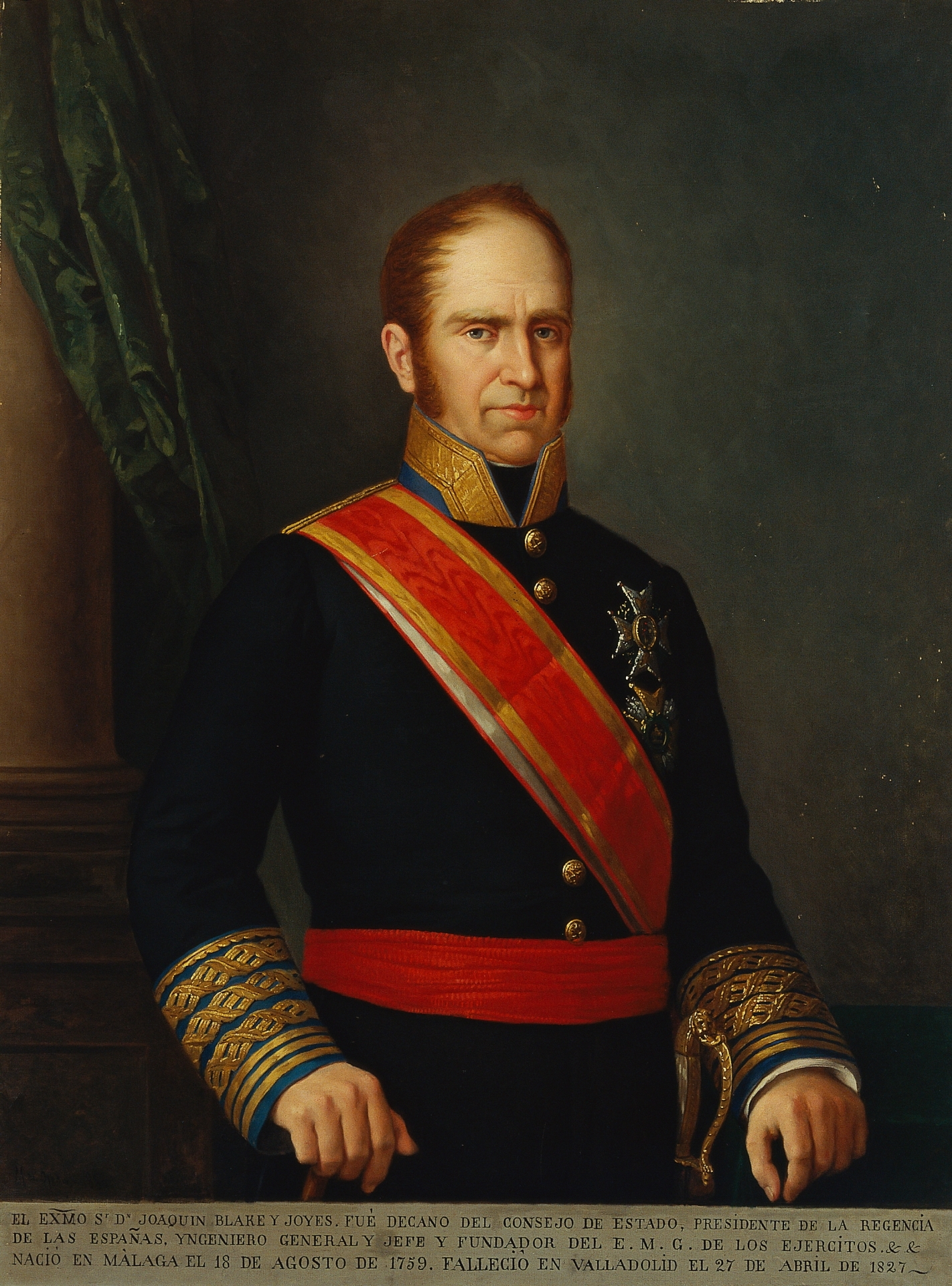
Joaquín Blake y Joyes

After his victory, Blake marched on Zaragoza. He divided his 20,000 men into three divisions and advanced down the Huerva River. Juan Carlos de Aréizaga's division marched on the right bank while Blake took two divisions down the left bank. Suchet detailed Laval and one 2,000-man brigade to contain Aréizaga, while massing Musnier's division and Pierre-Joseph Habert's brigade against Blake. In the Battle of María on 15 June 1809, Suchet defeated Blake and forced him to retreat. The Spanish army remained intact, though it lost 16 of its 25 guns. The French and Poles lost 700 or 800 casualties out of 10,000 infantry, 800 cavalry, and 12 guns. The Spanish suffered losses of 1,000 killed, 3,000 to 4,000 wounded, and hundreds captured out of 14,000 infantry and 1,000 cavalry. Habert's brigade, which was part of Laval's division, included the 14th Line and 3rd Vistula Legion. The next day, Suchet tried to bring the combined Spanish army to battle at Botorrita, but Blake slipped away.

On 18 June 1809, Blake made a stand in the Battle of Belchite. The Spanish army deployed on some hills before the town of Belchite. Suchet ordered Musnier to assault the Spanish left and Habert to attack the right. Musnier's troops drove back Blake's left wing. As Habert's offensive gained momentum, a lucky hit detonated a number of Spanish ammunition wagons. The explosion panicked Blake's troops and they all fled. Suchet left Musnier to watch Blake's force and marched back to Zaragoza with Laval to restore order. The Spanish suffered 2,000 casualties out of 11,000 infantry and 870 cavalry, plus all nine of their remaining guns. The French lost only 200 killed and wounded. In addition to the units forming Habert's brigade, Laval had the 44th Line Infantry Regiment on hand.

Laval spent the next few months pacifying the northern part of Aragon. At the end of August he took 3,000 troops and successfully assaulted the monastery of San Juan de la Peña near Jaca. Colonel Renovales withdrew and was later trapped between III Corps troops and French national guards. Under the terms of his surrender the Spaniard was allowed free passage to Catalonia where he continued his guerilla operations. But Aragon was quiet in September and October. In December, Laval occupied the area near Teruel, forcing the Junta of Aragon to flee. In January 1810, the 23,140-man III Corps was organized into three infantry divisions under Laval, Musnier, and Habert, and a cavalry brigade under General of Brigade André Joseph Boussart. Laval's 1st Division included 6 battalions and 4,290 effectives. The division was made up of two battalions each of the 2nd Legion of the Vistula and the 14th and 44th Line Infantry Regiments. The 3rd Legion of the Vistula was nominally part of the division but detached elsewhere. At this time, the division's headquarters were at Mont-ral.

Suchet wanted to move against Mequinenza and Lérida, but King Joseph Bonaparte insisted that he advance on Valencia instead. Accordingly, he set out for the city and reached there on 6 March. His main column consisted of 8,000 men from Laval's division and part of Musnier's. They set out from Teruel and later rendezvoused with Habert's division. Suchet found Valencia's Spanish defenders determined to resist. Without heavy artillery to breach the walls, the French withdrew only four days later. While Suchet was absent from Aragon, the guerillas became very active in the province. Near Teruel, 300 French soldiers and four artillery pieces were captured by partisans. Back in Aragon, Suchet mounted the successful Siege of Lérida. Since he was left behind to defend Aragon, Laval did not participate in the siege or in the subsequent Siege of Mequinenza in June. Laval was named Baron of the Empire on 14 June 1810.

With Lérida captured, new orders arrived from Napoleon to seize Tortosa. The new commander in Catalonia, Marshal Jacques MacDonald was ordered by the emperor to cooperate with Suchet. In July, Suchet sent a force close to Tortosa while he assembled his siege equipment at Mequinenza. At the beginning of August, Henry O'Donnell led 2,500 Spanish regulars to Tortosa. On 3 August, O'Donnell marched out of Tortosa to attack Laval's division, which was watching the city. The Spanish troops broke through the first defensive line but were unable to defeat the French and had to retreat. O'Donnell subsequently returned to Tarragona. Soon afterward, Suchet chased away the Army of Valencia which was threatening the force in front of Tortosa. By mid-August, MacDonald and 16,000 soldiers were finally cooperating with Suchet. Laval died of fever at Mora de Rubielos on 6 September 1810. His name is on the Arc de Triomphe on Column 36.
