= Pierre-Joseph Habert =

French general

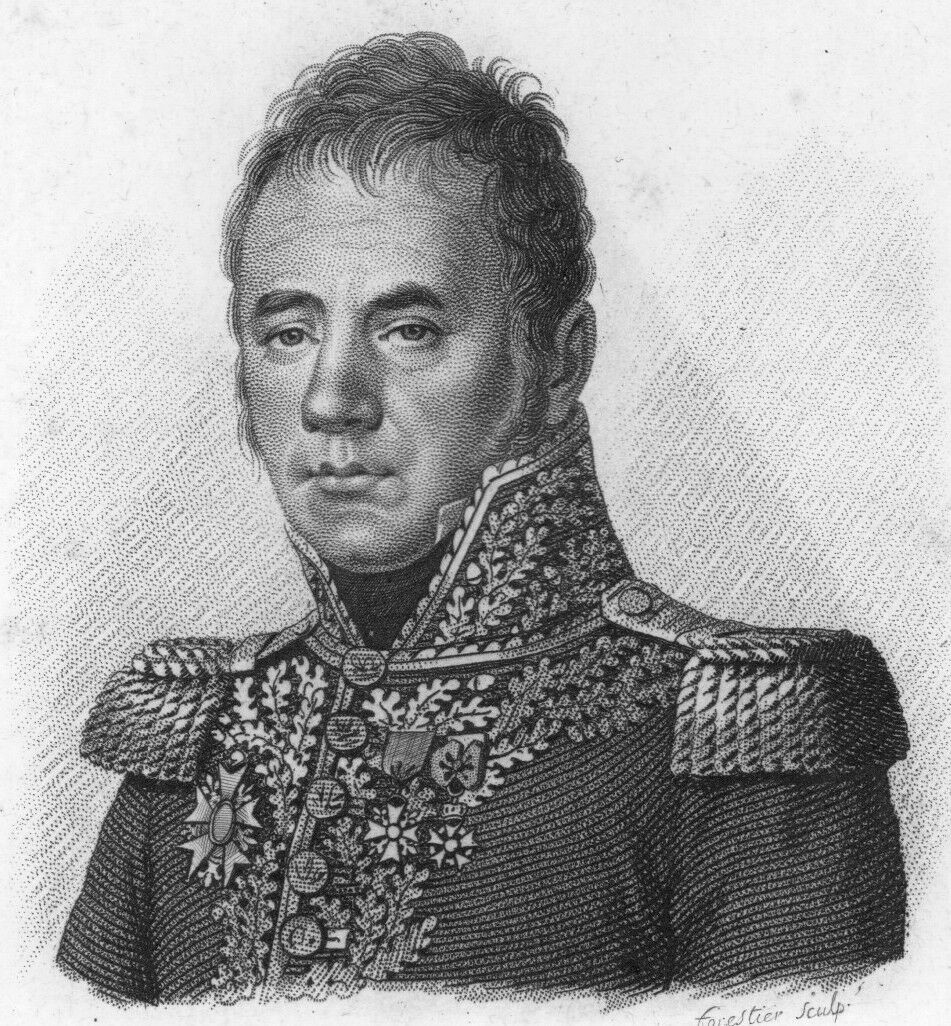
- General of Division Pierre-Joseph Habert
- Born: 22 December 1773; Avallon, France
- Died: 19 May 1825 (aged 51) Montréal, Yonne, France
- Allegiance: France
- Branch: Infantry
- Service years: 1792–1815
- Rank: General of Division
- Conflicts: French Revolutionary Wars; Napoleonic Wars
- Awards: Légion d'Honneur
- Children: Jeanne-Mathilde Herbelin
- Other work: Baron of the Empire

Pierre-Joseph Habert (French pronunciation: [pjɛʁ ʒozɛf abɛʁ]; 22 December 1773 – 19 May 1825) enlisted in the French army at the beginning of the French Revolutionary Wars and led a division during the Napoleonic Wars. After serving in the army from 1792 to 1797, he fought in Ireland and Egypt, rising in rank to become a colonel by 1802. Under Emperor Napoleon, he led his regiment in the 1805 campaign against Austria. In the 1806–1807 campaign he saw action at Jena, Golymin, Eylau, and Heilsberg and was wounded twice in the last-named battle.

Promoted to general officer, Habert was posted to Spain where he achieved fame in the Peninsular War. After having fought with varying fortunes in 1808 and 1809, General and later Marshal Louis-Gabriel Suchet arrived to take command in Aragon. A string of almost unbroken successes followed. Though only a general of brigade, Habert was named to lead Suchet's 3rd Division in actions at Lerida, Tortosa, and Tarragona. After being promoted, he led his division at Saguntum, Valencia, Castalla, and Ordal. He became known as the Ajax of the Army of Catalonia for his prolonged defense of Barcelona in 1814. He commanded a division during the Hundred Days at Ligny and Wavre, though he missed the Battle of Waterloo. Habert is one of the names inscribed under the Arc de Triomphe.

== Revolution ==
Born the son of Avallon bookseller Henry Habert in Franche-Comté on 22 December 1773, Habert joined the French army on 1 September 1792 at the start of the War of the First Coalition. Quickly named captain of the 4th battalion of Yonne volunteers, within two years he rose to become a chef de bataillon (major) in the 107th Demi-Brigade. The year 1796 found him serving in the 3rd Foreign Demi-Brigade. He went with Lazare Hoche's abortive expedition to Ireland in 1796 and then the second expedition to Ireland in support of the Irish Rebellion of 1798. Captured by the British, he spent a number of months as a prisoner before being released. Sent to Egypt with dispatches, his ship evaded the British naval blockade and he was appointed aide-de-camp to Jacques-François Menou. He distinguished himself at the Battle of Heliopolis on 20 March 1800. On 21 March 1801, Menou appointed him an acting general of brigade following his actions at the Second Battle of Abukir. He returned to France after the Capitulation of Alexandria.

== Early Empire ==
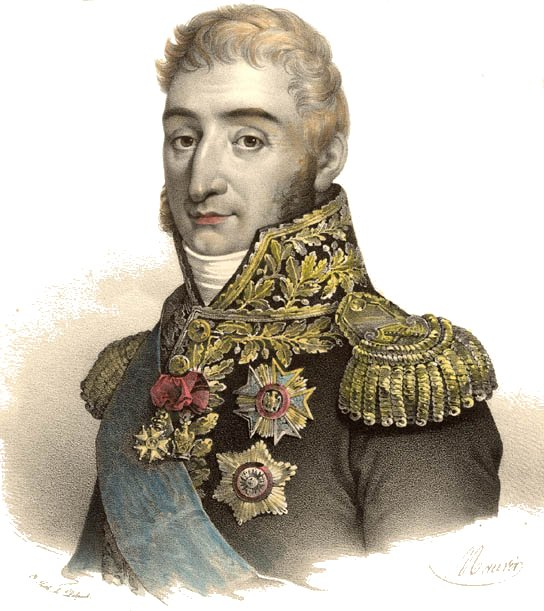
Marshal Pierre Augereau

On 29 May 1802, now a chef de brigade (colonel), Habert received command of the 105th Line Infantry Regiment. He became a chevalier of the Légion d'Honneur in 1803 and an officer of the Légion in 1804. During this time his unit guarded the west coast of France. In August 1805, at the start of the War of the Third Coalition, his regiment joined Jacques Desjardin's division of Marshal Charles-Pierre Augereau's VII Corps. Having a long march from the environs of Brest, Augereau's men missed the bulk of the fighting but managed to trap Franz Jellacic's Austrian division near Lake Constance. On 13 November, Augereau with Desjardin's 1st Division forced Jellacic to surrender his 4,000 troops in the Capitulation of Dornbirn in the Vorarlberg. The Austrians were allowed to march off to Bohemia on condition that they would not fight against France for one year.

The beginning of the War of the Fourth Coalition saw Habert's 105th Regiment serving in Jacques Lefranc's brigade of Desjardin's VII Corps Division. At the Battle of Jena on 14 October 1806, Desjardin's division seized the village of Isserstadt, piercing the right-center of the Prussian-Saxon front and rescuing Marshal Michel Ney's advance guard from a precarious situation.

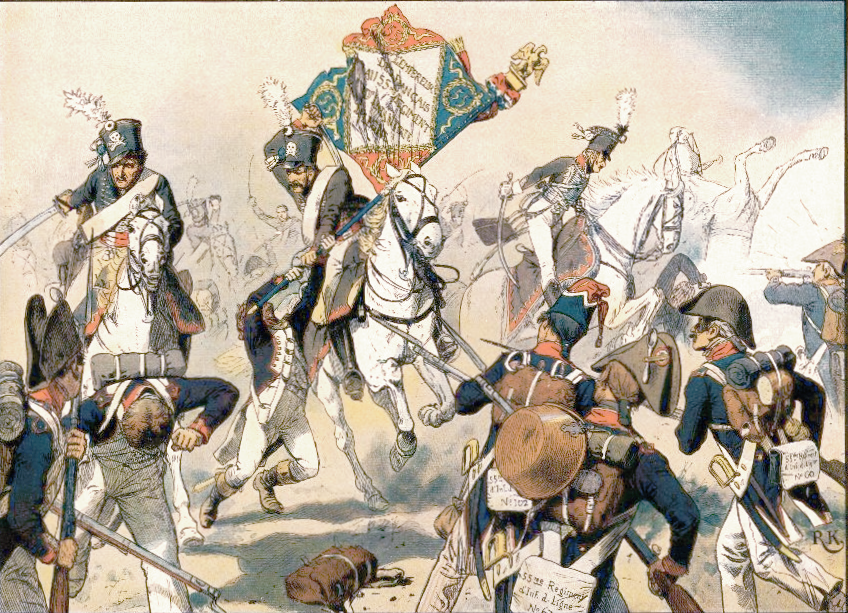
Habert was wounded at the Battle of Heilsberg. This Richard Knötel print shows an incident in the battle.

On 24 December, Augereau forced a crossing of the Wkra River in Poland in the Battle of Czarnowo. He sent Étienne Heudelet de Bierre's 2nd Division to attempt a passage at Sochocin, while Desjardin tried to cross at Kołoząb. A Russian division under Michael Andreas Barclay de Tolly opposed the French. Heudelet's attack was repulsed, but Desjardin met with success. Desjardin pinned down the Russians with covering fire, while some elite companies stormed across the partially destroyed bridge. Pierre Belon Lapisse led Desjardin's other brigade in a flank attack. The combined assault drove off the Russian defenders and captured six field pieces.

Habert led the 105th against the Russians at the Battle of Golymin on 26 December. Desjardin's division reached the field first and pressed back a Russian infantry regiment. Reinforced, the Russians pushed back Desjardin's men, who rallied and came on again. This time Desjardin's 2nd Brigade was stopped by grapeshot only 50 paces from the enemy guns. The brigade fell back 200 yards and formed squares in front of the village of Kaleczin. The Russians retreated that night.

The 105th fought at the Battle of Eylau on 8 February 1807. At 2:00 PM, Emperor Napoleon ordered an unwell Augereau to attack the Russian left flank. As the movement got underway, a blizzard swept across the battlefield. Blinded by the snow, the VII Corps veered to the left of its intended attack axis to strike the Russian center. Pounded unmercifully by a 70-gun battery and swamped by counterattacking infantry and cavalry, Augereau's soldiers suffered huge losses and the remnants fled. His division commander Desjardin was killed. The decimated VII Corps was discontinued and the survivors distributed to other corps. Habert was transferred to Claude Legrand's division in Marshal Nicolas Soult's IV Corps on 21 February. He fought at the Battle of Heilsberg on 10 June 1807 where he was wounded in the head and shoulder. On 11 July 1807 he became a commandant in the Légion d'Honneur.

== Middle Empire ==
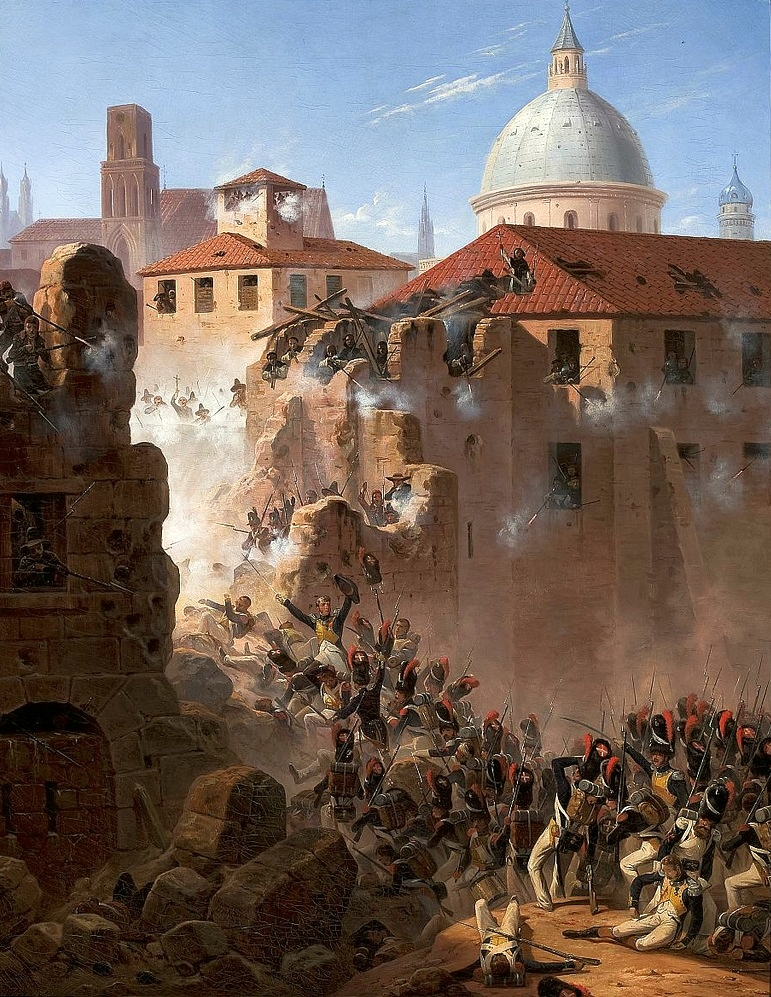
Assault on Saragossa by January Suchodolski, 1845

On 18 February 1808, Habert won promotion to general of brigade and was granted 4,000 francs worth of annual rent from property in the Kingdom of Westphalia. Transferred to Spain, he served as a brigade commander in the division of Pierre Hugues Victoire Merle for three weeks before being reassigned to Jean-Antoine Verdier's division in mid-June. Both divisions formed part of Jean-Baptiste Bessières army corps. During this period, from 15 June to 14 August, the French waged the unsuccessful First Siege of Zaragoza. During the siege, Habert led an independent 3,104-man brigade that consisted of the 1st and 2nd Battalions each of the 1st Legion of the Vistula (1,243 men) and the 1st Supplementary Regiment of the Reserve Legion (1,030 men), the 4th Battalion of the 15th Line Infantry Regiment (411 men), and the 3rd Battalion of the 47th Line Infantry Regiment (420 men).

From August, he served in Charles Louis Dieudonné Grandjean's division. By early November he transferred again to lead the 2nd Brigade of Maurice Mathieu's division in Marshal Bon-Adrien Jeannot de Moncey's III Corps. On 23 November, Mathieu's division fought in the French victory at the Battle of Tudela. From 19 December 1808 to 20 February 1809, the III Corps participated in the Second Siege of Zaragoza. In this bloodbath, 18,000 Spaniards died of battle injuries or sickness. French losses were also staggering, with 4,000 killed in battle plus an additional 6,000 succumbing to disease. The III Corps, now led by Jean-Andoche Junot easily overran the Ebro valley after the fall of Saragossa. However, Spanish guerillas and regulars were soon active again. As war with Austria threatened, Napoleon withdrew large forces from Spain, leaving Junot only 15,000 troops to occupy the province of Aragon.

In May, Habert received a rude introduction to guerilla warfare when Colonel Perena led his militia in chasing out the French garrison at Monzón. Desiring to recapture the town, Habert sent a force consisting of about 1,000 men from his elite companies plus some cuirassiers across the Cinca River downstream from Monzón. However, the river flooded without warning, trapping his detachment on the far bank. With the rest of his troops Habert attempted to cross at Monzón itself, but Perena's men repelled all his assaults on 16 May. The cavalry swam their horses across the river and escaped. But the isolated foot soldiers ran out of ammunition and were forced to surrender on 19 May as Habert watched helplessly. In this action, Habert commanded Junot's 1st Division of 9,000 troops and 12 guns, with two squadrons of the 13th Cuirassier Regiment attached. Perena's estimated 10,000 Miqueletes captured three voltiguer (light) companies of the 14th Line Infantry Regiment, the grenadier and voltiguer companies of the 116th Line Infantry Regiment, and possibly other units.

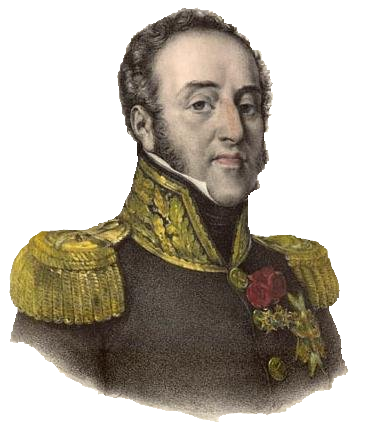
Louis Gabriel Suchet

On the day that Habert's elite companies laid down their arms, Louis-Gabriel Suchet arrived to replace Junot in command. The Battle of Alcañiz on 23 May 1809, Suchet's first action in independent command, was a French defeat at the hands of Joaquín Blake y Joyes. Before the battle, Habert was ordered to join Suchet. In the action, the 1st Division was led by Anne-Gilbert Laval while the 2nd Division was commanded by Louis François Félix Musnier. Habert is not listed in the order of battle.

Soon, Blake was menacing Zaragoza and Suchet led his rallied troops out to fight the Battle of María on 15 June. In this action, the French corps commander detached Laval to protect Saragossa, while Habert led the remainder of the 1st Division. Knowing 3,000 reinforcements were due to arrive, Suchet maintained the defensive all day. When the hoped-for troops showed up at 4:00 PM, the French general hurled Habert's infantry and Pierre Watier's cavalry at Blake's right wing. Under the double attack, the Spanish line caved in. The French inflicted 1,000 killed and 3,000 to 4,000 wounded on their opponents while suffering 700 to 800 killed and wounded. Two days later, Blake stood to fight again at Belchite. Suchet sent Musnier to assault the Spanish left flank while Habert attacked the right. Just as Habert's troops became engaged, the French artillery scored a lucky hit on a Spanish artillery caisson behind the right wing. The resulting explosion set off a series of blasts that provoked Blake's men into a panicky flight from the field. The French lost about 200 casualties while their opponents lost ten times as many, plus 20 ammunition wagons. One source credited Laval with command of the 1st Division in this engagement.

Having cleared the Ebro valley, Suchet sent Musnier to fight guerillas to the north, while Laval battled the Spanish to the south. For the remainder of 1809, the III Corps waged local anti-guerilla operations. A January 1810 order of battle shows that Habert commanded Suchet's 3rd Division, though he still ranked as a general of brigade. Its strength was 4,329 men in seven battalions. At this time King Joseph Bonaparte insisted that Suchet capture Valencia. Accordingly, the III Corps commander advanced to the gates of that port city on 6 March, but within four days abandoned the futile blockade and retreated. Instead, Suchet advanced on Lleida (Lerida), arriving before the city on 15 April and inflicting a stinging repulse to a Spanish relief force on 23 April at Margalef. The French sat down to begin the Siege of Lerida on 29 April. During the operation, Habert's division included two battalions each of the 5th Light and 116th Line Infantry Regiments, three battalions of the 117th Line, and two foot artillery batteries. The Spanish governor Garcia Conde surrendered on 13 May with 7,000 men.

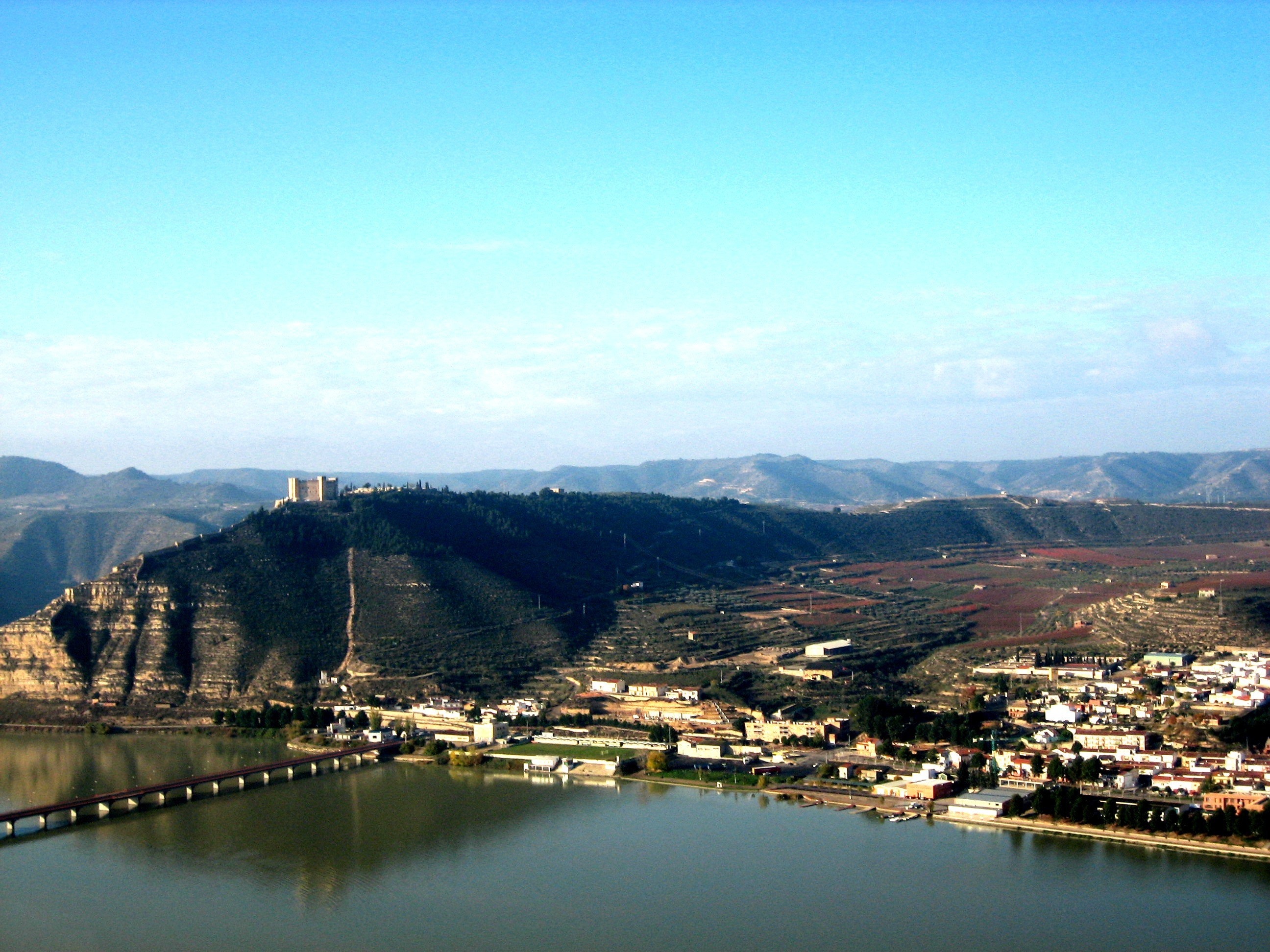
Mequinenza with its cliff-top castle at left

Suchet followed this success with the Siege of Mequinenza by investing the town and its fortress on a bluff high above the Ebro River, on 15 May. After cutting a new road up the height, the French dragged their siege guns within range and began a bombardment of the castle. The Spanish commander capitulated with 1,000 men around 5 June. Habert's 3rd Division participated in the operation. Suchet's next assignment was to seize the fortress-city of Tortosa, a strategically important location which controlled the lower Ebro crossing between Barcelona and Valencia. The III Corps managed to isolate the city, but was unable to begin a formal siege for many months because of the activities of Spanish guerillas and regular armies in both Aragon and Catalonia. However, Suchet finally got his heavy artillery forward and Marshal Jacques MacDonald arrived with his VII Corps to cover the proposed operation by 10 December.

The Siege of Tortosa began on either 16 or 19 December 1810. Suchet pursued siege operations with vigor and on 2 January 1811 secured the surrender of Spanish commander Conde de Alacha Lilli and his garrison, though some managed to escape. Habert's division was left to defend the place while Suchet consolidated his gains. Of the 7,179 defenders, 1,400 were killed or wounded and 3,974 were captured. French losses were about 400. Habert's division was the same as at Lerida, except that three battalions of the 16th Line Infantry replaced the 116th Line, which was transferred to Jean Isidore Harispe's division.

Promised his marshal's baton if he captured Tarragona, Suchet arrived in front of that coastal city on 3 May. The organization of Habert's division was the same as at Lerida. The Siege of Tarragona began on 5 May and lasted until 29 June 1811. The French captured Fort Olivo on 29 May and repulsed a counterattack the next day. Despite bitter resistance, they overcame the outlying forts one by one. On 21 June, Suchet's troops burst into the lower city and captured it. Three columns of French soldiers stormed into the upper city on 28 June. Gathering his men, Habert led a climactic charge against the defenders, breaking all resistance and capturing the Spanish commander Juan Senen de Contreras. The French infantry went berserk, massacring many helpless Spanish soldiers. English and Spanish accounts claim that up to 4,000 civilians were butchered. The French, while admitting that their troops ran amok, denied that their soldiers killed anyone other than armed enemies. As promised, Napoleon appointed Suchet a Marshal of France. During the siege, the French suffered 4,300 casualties, while inflicting 14,000 to 15,000 losses on the Spanish, including 8,000 men captured.

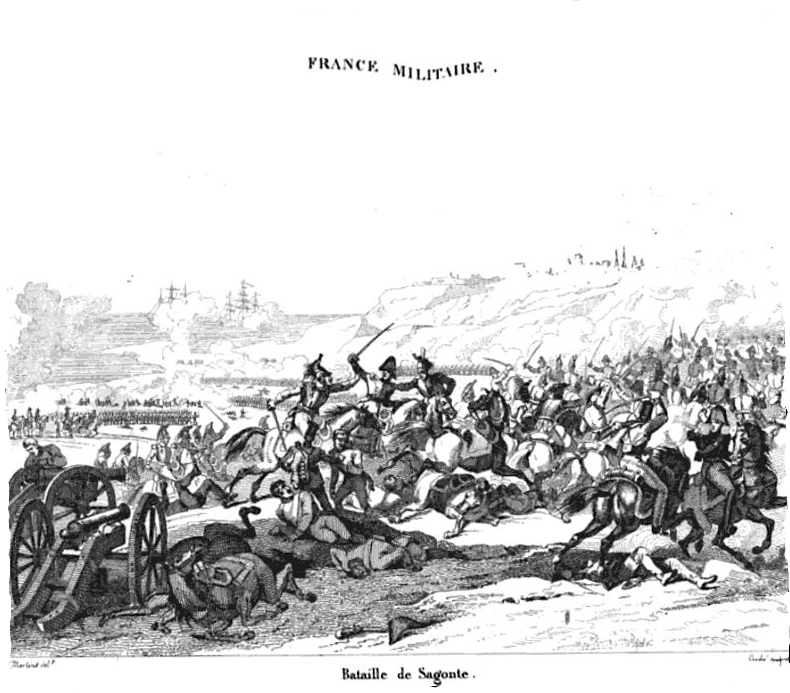
Battle of Saguntum, 25 October 1811

Habert was elevated in rank to general of division on 25 June 1811 and appointed Baron of the Empire on 18 July. According to a 15 July 1811 return of Suchet's newly named Army of Aragon, Habert's division included 4,433 men in 11 battalions. Reorganized for the invasion of Valencia in September, his 3rd Division included the 2,119-strong brigade of Louis François Elie Pelletier Montmarie and the 1,340-man brigade of Nicolas Bronikowski d'Oppeln. Suchet reached the towering castle of Sagunto (Saguntum) on 23 September. After the garrison repelled two premature attacks, Blake arrived nearby with a relief army. On 25 October, the Spanish general attacked the French to open the Battle of Saguntum. Suchet deployed Habert's division on the left flank, next to the coast. Though outnumbered two-to-one, the French quickly routed Blake's left flank units, but the Spanish center and right fought stubbornly. Habert was forced to refuse his left flank to avoid being bombarded from the sea by enemy gunboats. After an intense struggle in the center, the Spaniards collapsed and ran. Habert wheeled his division to cut off their escape through the village of Puzzol, but the Walloon Guards Regiment bravely held the escape route open at great cost to themselves. The French inflicted over 6,000 casualties on their adversaries while losing 1,000 killed and wounded. The 2,500 defenders of Saguntum castle quickly capitulated.

Next, Suchet turned his gaze toward Valencia. His army included the infantry divisions of Musnier, Harispe, Habert, Giuseppe Federico Palombini, Claude Antoine Compère, plus André Joseph Boussart's cavalry division. To these were added the infantry divisions of Honoré Charles Reille and Filippo Severoli to make a powerful army of 33,000 men. Suchet planned a double envelopment, with the greater part of his forces massed inland to cut behind Blake's left flank. Meanwhile, Habert was ordered to break through the Spanish right flank between Valencia and the sea. While minor forces distracted Blake in front, Suchet's pincers closed on the city on 25 December 1811. In the Siege of Valencia, Habert carried out his assignment, scattering José Obispo's troops on the right, while Suchet overran the Spanish left. Blake's flanking troops escaped, but the bulk of his troops were forced into the city where they surrendered on 8 January 1812. For a loss of 2,000 troops the French inflicted horrendous losses on their opponents, 4,011 killed or died of illness plus 16,270 men and 374 guns captured. Only 7,071 Spanish soldiers escaped the trap.

== Late Empire ==
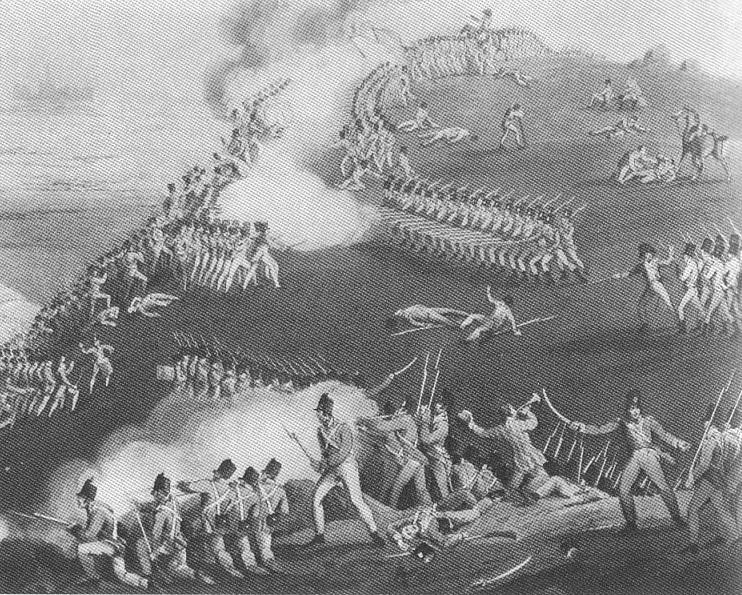
Battle of Castalla, 13 April 1813

Suchet soon fell ill with fever and was unable to mount further operations. Overstretched by his conquests, Suchet went over to the defensive during 1812. In mid-autumn of that year, a French order of battle listed seven battalions and 4,975 soldiers in Habert's division. Great events were occurring elsewhere in Spain during this time, including the Battle of Salamanca on 22 July and the Siege of Burgos in the fall. During this period, King Joseph abandoned Madrid and sought refuge with Suchet in Valencia before the king and Marshal Nicolas Soult recaptured Madrid.

Habert's next action was the Battle of Castalla on 13 April 1813. In that conflict, Suchet sent Louis-Benoit Robert's division to attack the left flank of John Murray, 8th Baronet's Anglo-Spanish army. Meanwhile, the marshal ordered Habert to contain Murray's center, Boussart to observe the enemy right flank, and Harispe to remain in reserve. When Robert's assault failed, Suchet directed Habert to withdraw and Harispe to cover the retreat. At the battle Habert commanded only 2,722 men in four battalions. These units were two battalions of the 14th Line Infantry Regiment and one battalion each of the 16th and 117th Line. At the time of the Siege of Tarragona in June 1813, Habert's 3rd Division numbered 4,120 men in six battalions. After the Battle of Vitoria on 21 June, Suchet was forced to evacuate Valencia and Aragon, while falling back to Catalonia.

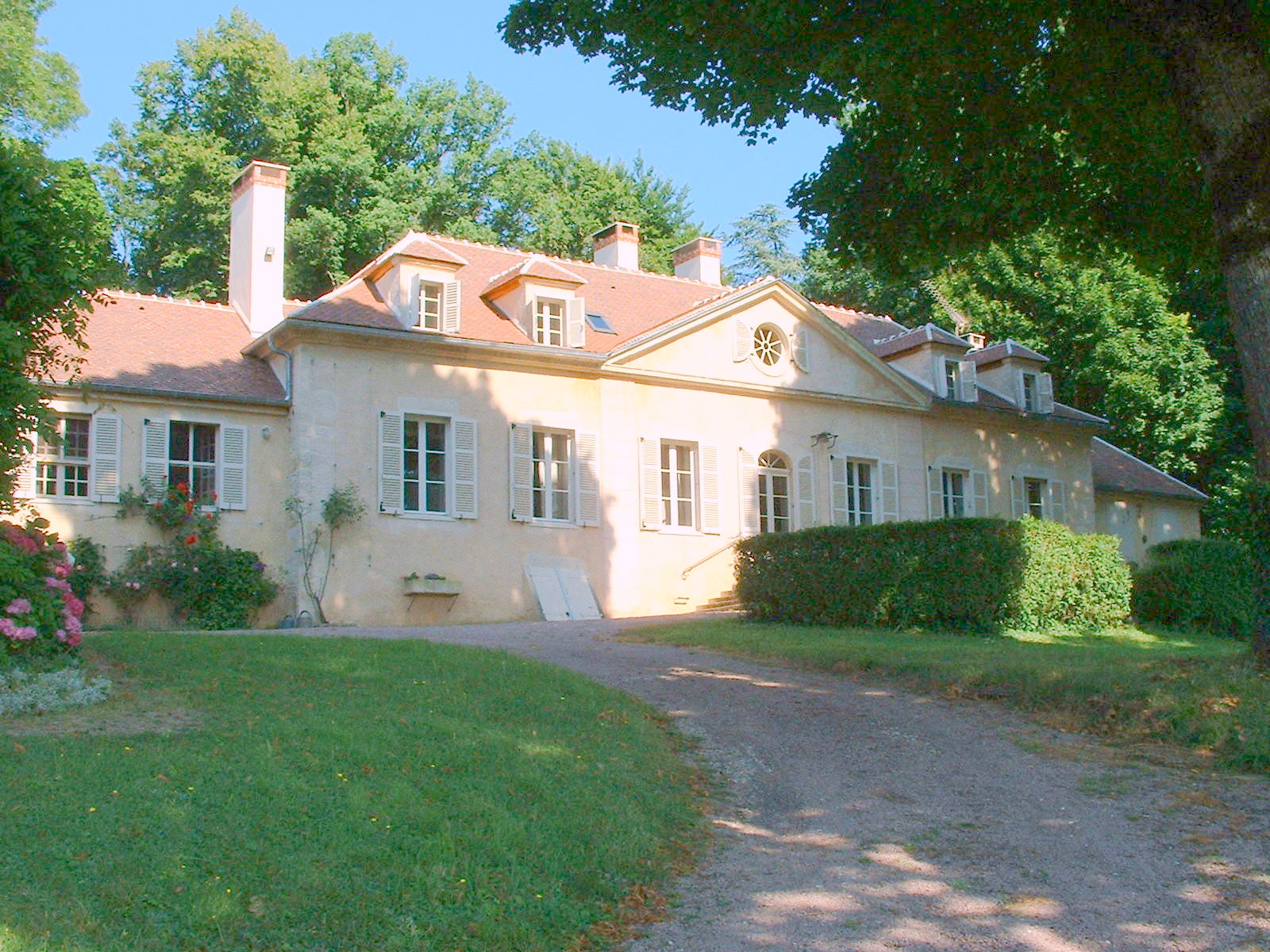
Habert's house in Montréal

Habert led the 3rd Division at the Battle of Ordal on 13 September 1813. The 14th, 16th, and 117th Line each had two battalions in the fight. Suchet attacked the inadequately patrolled Anglo-Spanish positions in the night and administered a one-sided drubbing to his enemies. A late 1813 order of battle placed Habert in command of Suchet's 4th Division, counting 3,975 men in four battalions. As Napoleon drained Suchet's strength away in order to defend eastern France, the marshal was left with only 17,000 soldiers. Forced to abandon most of Catalonia, he installed Habert as governor of Barcelona. For his tenacious defense of that city in the face of a besieging army of 30,000 and a British naval squadron, Habert earned the sobriquet the Ajax of the Army of Catalonia. On 16 April 1814, Habert launched a sortie for the purpose of collecting food which resulted in 200 French casualties. When a spy reported news of Napoleon's abdication on 19 April, Habert made his soldiers swear allegiance to the now-deposed emperor. On 24 April, he refused to accept with the walls a French colonel bearing news of an armistice. The next day, when the Frenchman returned with a British naval officer to work out the details of the French evacuation of Barcelona, Habert raged against the colonel, calling him a "traitor", and had to be restrained by his staff. Habert only agreed to discuss terms of surrender on 27 April.

Habert became a grand officer of the Légion d'Honneur on 29 July 1814 after King Louis XVIII's restoration to power. After commanding the 2nd Division, he joined Napoleon during the Hundred Days and was appointed to lead the 10th Division in Dominique Vandamme's III Corps. The division included the 22nd, 34th, 70th, and 88th Line Infantry Regiments. At the Battle of Ligny on 16 June 1815, his division attacked the Prussians holding the village of Saint-Amand. His troops captured the place, lost it to a counterattack, and captured it again.

At the Battle of Wavre on 18 June, Vandamme, without waiting for orders from Marshal Emmanuel Grouchy, ordered Habert to attack the town. His troops quickly flushed the Prussian skirmishers out of Aisemont, south of the Dyle River. Habert launched a strong column of infantry at the main bridge, covered by two 12-pounder batteries, one on each side of the main road. The initial attempt failed, along with two more assaults. In the attack, Habert and 600 of his men were struck down by Prussian fire. Shot in the lower abdomen, he was placed in inactive status on 1 August 1815 though he was assigned to the general staff. He bought a home in Montréal, Yonne and moved there in 1817. He was still officially part of the general staff as late as 30 December 1818 and retired on 1 December 1824. He died of an unhealed war wound at his house in Montréal on 19 May 1825 and is buried nearby. HABERT is inscribed on Column 36 of the Arc de Triomphe.
