= Battle of Belchite (1809) =

1809 battle during the Peninsular War

- Part of the Peninsular War
| Date | 18 June 1809 |
| Location | Belchite, Spain 41°18′N 0°45′W |
| Result | Franco-Polish victory |

Belligerents
| (France) French Empire; Duchy of Warsaw | Kingdom of Spain |

Commanders and leaders
| (First French Empire) Louis Gabriel Suchet | (Spain) Joaquín Blake |

Strength
| 13,000 | 12,000 |

Casualties and losses
| 200 | 2,000 |

Peninsular War: Aragón Catalonia
current battle

The Battle of Belchite on 18 June 1809 saw a Franco-Polish corps led by Louis Gabriel Suchet fight a small Spanish army under Joaquín Blake y Joyes. Suchet's force won the battle when a lucky hit detonated a large part of the Spanish ammunition supply. The ensuing blast provoked Blake's soldiers into a panicky flight from the battlefield. The action was fought during the Peninsular War, part of the Napoleonic Wars. Belchite is located 40 kilometres (25 mi) southeast of Zaragoza.

== Background ==
The Spanish campaign in early 1809 started with the Battle of Uclés.

=== Prelude ===
General of Division Suchet took command of the III Corps and immediately moved to oust the army of Captain General Blake from Aragon. The resulting Battle of Alcañiz on 23 May was a victory for the Spanish as they repulsed a Franco-Polish frontal attack. This victory brought Blake's army 25,000 volunteers, many of whom could not be provided with weapons.

Blake advanced down the Huerva River with two divisions on the left bank and one division under General Juan Carlos de Aréizaga on the right bank. A more circumspect Suchet initially fought on the defensive in the Battle of María on 15 June. The French general sent General of Division Anne-Gilbert Laval with a 2,000-man brigade to watch Aréizaga while retaining the rest of his small corps to face Blake. After fending off Blake's attacks for several hours, Suchet went over to the attack when some French reinforcements arrived. He overwhelmed the Spanish right flank and compelled Blake to order a withdrawal. The next day, Suchet advanced against the combined forces of Blake and Aréizaga. Blake declined to fight and instead fell back. Discouraged by defeat, 3,000 of Blake's new recruits deserted.

== Battle ==
After joining with Aréizaga's division, Blake was only able to muster 11,000 infantry, 870 cavalry, and nine guns. He drew up this force on some hills in front of the town of Belchite. After Suchet ordered Laval to join him, he massed 12,000 infantry, 1,000 cavalry, and 12 artillery pieces for the battle. The French general paid no attention to the Spanish center and instead sent his two divisions to attack the enemy flanks. General of Division Louis François Félix Musnier assaulted the Spanish left flank and began forcing it back into the town. General of Brigade Pierre-Joseph Habert sent his soldiers against the opposite flank. Just as Habert's attack got rolling, a French shell blew up an artillery caisson in the Spanish right rear. The fire spread to some ammunition wagons and soon there was a titanic explosion as Blake's gunpowder supplies detonated. With this, the Spanish soldiers panicked, some throwing down their muskets in order to flee faster.

The French swept forward, killing, wounding, or capturing 2,000 Spaniards. They seized all nine of Blake's cannons plus one color and a quantity of food and equipment. Suchet reported losses of 200 killed and wounded. Leaving Musnier's division to observe Blake's survivors, Suchet marched back to Zaragoza.

== Aftermath ==
The guerilla war proceeded till the end of the Peninsular war.

The Spanish conventional warfare proceeded till the end of the Peninsular war.

The British intervention proceeded till the end of the Peninsular war.

Napoleon had ended his invasion of Spain with the occupation of Madrid.

The Corunna campaign had ended with the withdrawal of the British army from Spain.

The Spanish campaign in early 1809 had ended.

The Second Portuguese campaign started with the Battle of Braga.
