= Juan Carlos Aréizaga =

Spanish military officer

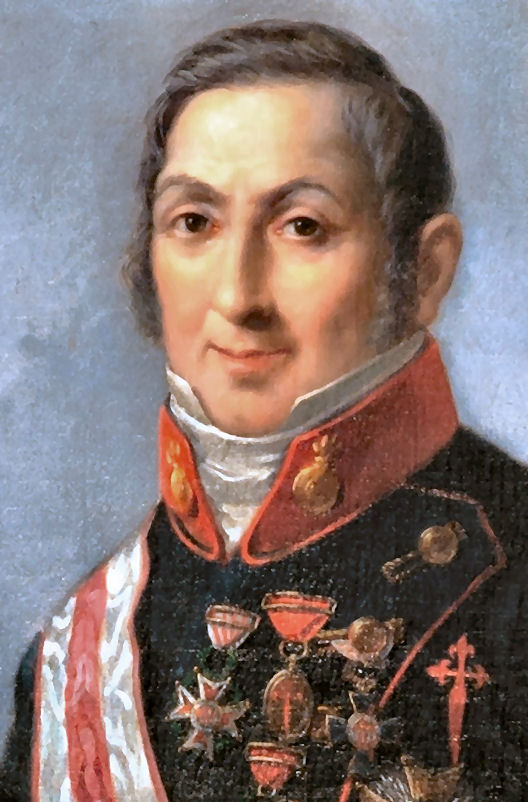
- Born: 17 January 1756; Fuenterrabía, Guipúzcoa
- Died: 18 March 1820 (aged 64) Tolosa, Guipúzcoa
- Allegiance: Spain
- Conflicts: Spanish–Algerian war; Invasion of Algiers; War of the Pyrenees; Peninsular War; Battle of Tudela; Battle of Alcañiz; Battle of María; Battle of Belchite; Battle of Ocaña

Juan Carlos Aréizaga y Alduncín (1756–1820) was a Spanish military commander.

Many historians of the Peninsular War, including Gómez de Arteche, Toreno, Clonard and Oman, agree that, while not questioning Aréizaga's personal courage, he lacked the necessary skills required of a general.

Oman was especially scathing in his assessment of Aréizaga's command at Ocaña:

Even allowing for the fact that Areizaga had been the victim of the Junta's insensate resolve to make an offensive movement on Madrid, it is impossible to speak with patience of his generalship. For a combination of rashness and vacillation it excels that of any other Spanish general during the whole war. (Oman 1903: p. 96.)

== Early career ==
As a cadet in the Mallorca Infantry Regiment, Aréizaga saw action during the Invasion of Algiers in 1775, where he was badly wounded.

Promoted to Fusiliers captain in August 1790, he saw action in the defence of Oran and remained garrisoned there until October 1791.

Aréizaga retired as a colonel in 1805.

== Peninsular War ==
At the outbreak of the War, he marched towards Zaragoza, recruiting troops along the way and presented himself for duty to Castaños in November. After the defeat at Tudela, Francisco Palafox, then a commissioner for the Supreme Central Junta, gave Aréizaga command of an Infantry division.

Aréizaga was promoted to brigadier at the beginning of March 1809, and after raising troops in Mequinenza, in Aragón, near the fronitier with Catalonia, marched them to Tortosa. He then presented himself for duty at the Junta Central in Seville, and was promoted to field marshal at the beginning of May. He was then given command of the 3rd Division of Joaquín Blake's Army of Aragón, which was victorious at Alcañiz towards the end of the month, and for which he was promoted to lieutenant general. He was then defeated at María the following June and again, three days later, at Belchite. Following his retreat from that battle, Aréizaga was appointed governor of Lérida, until the end of September, when he was transferred to the newly formed Army of the Centre, under the interim command of General Eguía, whom he would succeed the following October. (Note: Following Cuesta's resignation in mid-August, due to the injuries that he had received at Medellin the previous March, interim command of the Army of Estremadura had been given to his second-in-command, General Eguía (Oman 1908: p. 69.) who, the following month marched three divisions of infantry and twelve or thirteen regiments of cavalry, some 25,000 men in all. The remainder of the Army of Extremadura, two divisions of infantry, numbering some 12,000 troops, plus 2,500 cavalry, was left in Estremadura under the Duke of Albuquerque, who then had to send a cavalry brigade to join the Army of the North, leaving him with only five cavalry regiments, some 1,500 sabres. Of his infantry, over 4,000 were needed to garrison Badajoz, leaving him only 8,000 men available in the field. (Oman, 1908: p. 69.) Eguía's troops were to join Venegas's Army of La Mancha, a united force that would now exceed 50,000 sabres and bayonets, and with which the Junta intended to take Madrid. However, Venegas was then removed from the command of the united army, with Eguía again holding interim command for a few days until Areizaga arrived from Lerida to take up his new command. (Oman 1908: p. 73.))

Based on the combined movements of the Duke of Albuquerque's Army of Extremadura, the Duke del Parque's Army of the Left and Aréizaga's new Army of the Centre, the Junta Central, contrary to Wellington's advice, had prepared a plan expel the French troops from Madrid.

At the command of the new army, (Note: His army was the best which had been seen under the Spanish banners since Tudela. The men had all been furnished with new clothes and equipment since August, mainly from English stores landed at Cadiz. There were sixty guns, and such a body of cavalry as had never yet been collected during the war. (Oman 1908: pp. 84–85.)) (Note: A British officer attached to Areizaga's staff, Colonel Roche, sent the following dispatch to Wellington: I wish I had anything agreeable to communicate to you from this army. The corps which belonged to the original army of La Mancha are certainly in every respect superior to those from Estremadura ... But nothing can exceed the general discontent, dissatisfaction, and demoralization of the mass of the people and of the army. How can anybody who has the faculty of reason separate the inefficiency, intrigue, bad organization, and consequent disasters of the army from the source of all those evils in the Junta? (Oman 1908: pp. 85 & footnote 92.)) Aréizaga was routed by Marshal Soult at Ocaña, with about 4,000 Spaniards killed or wounded and 14,000 prisoners taken, as well as thirty flags and fifty of the sixty guns captured. (Note: Another source, Hindley (2010) puts the figure even higher, at twenty-six thousand out of fifty-four thousand Spanish troops dead, wounded, or imprisoned.)

Following his overwhelming defeat, Aréizaga resigned, resignation that was not accepted, and he retreated down to Sierra Morena, where he was unable to prevent Soult from entering Andalusia and head towards Seville with seventy thousand troops, forcing the Supreme Central Junta to abandon that city and retreat down to Cádiz.

Having been flanked by Soult on 20 January 1810, Aréizaga retreated to Granada, where he handed over command to Blake the following week.

Appointed governor of Cartagena in August 1810, he remained in that post until the following December, when he was attached to Marquis de La Romana's 5th Army. He arrived at Cádiz in April 1811 to find that he should instead go to Alicante, where he was being investigated for the defeat at Ocaña. After 18 months at Alicante, in February 1813 he was ordered to return to Cádiz. From June to December 1813 he was stationed at Algeciras before going to Madrid after having been appointed member of the Cortes for Navarre. However, his appointment was annulled due to the case still open against him for the defeat at Ocaña.

== Post-war career ==
With Fernando VII back on the throne, Areizaga was appointed captain general of Guipúzcoa in July 1814, and that same month the case against him for Ocaña was dismissed. He continued as governor until his death in 1820.

During the Hundred Days Areizaga was also given command of the Observation Corps of the Left (Ejército de Observación de la Izquierda) until June 1815, when he handed over his command to Enrique O'Donnell.
