= Martín García-Loygorri =

Spanish military officer

Martín García Loygorri (5 June 1759 in Corella, Navarra, Spain – 30 January 1824 in Madrid, Spain) was a Spanish soldier and reformer of Spanish Artillery.

== Early career ==
Born into a noble family, Loygorri was admitted at age thirteen as a cadet at the Royal School of Artillery at Segovia, from which he graduated as a second lieutenant, and top of his class, in December 1776. He first saw combat during the eighteen months he spent in Melilla (1777) and in July 1779 he was sent to participate in the Great Siege of Gibraltar, where he spent the following two years.

Loygorri then took part in the Invasion of Minorca (1781), for which he was promoted to Lieutenant of Infantry.

In June 1782, he returned to the siege at Gibraltar, and in July 1783 he was promoted to Lieutenant of Artillery and Captain of Infantry. In 1790, he was promoted to Captain of the Artillery branch.

In 1795, Loygorri was promoted to lieutenant-general and in 1797 he was sent as a member of the General Staff of the army in Extremadura, with which he participated in the invasion of Portugal in 1801, known as the War of the Oranges, and where he saw action at Campo Maior, Barbacena, Santa Eulália, Arronches, Portoalegre and Alegrete. In May 1802 he was promoted to lieutenant colonel of the Royal Artillery Corps and to colonel the following year.

From June 1806 to April 1807 Loygorri commanded the Artillery at Cádiz.

Appointed commander-in-chief of the Castilla Division in 1807, that same year he participated in yet another invasion of Portugal, being taken prisoner in Lisbon.

Shortly before the outbreak of the Peninsular War, Loygorri was transferred to Barcelona, where he was promoted to brigadier in September 1808.

== Peninsular War ==
In 1808 he was appointed commander-in-chief of Artillery of the Army of Catalonia, participating in the Blockade of Barcelona in November of that year and, the following year, to commander-in-chief of Artillery of the Army of Aragón and Valencia.

As a result of his decisive intervention at the battle of Alcañiz (1809), where his nineteen pieces of artillery were highly effective in repelling the French attack, he received the Laureate Cross of Saint Ferdinand and was promoted to field marshal, just eight months after having been promoted to brigadier.

He was appointed General Director of Artillery in 1812, after having been the acting director general since 1809.

== Later career ==
He was promoted to field marshal in 1815.

== Bibliography ==
- Fantoni y Benedí, Rafael de. El linaje navarro del general García-Loygorri, primer Laureado del ejército español, Hidalguía, 1981, pp. 1065-1075.
- Martínez de Baños Carrillo, Fernando. «Loygorri o la eficacia de las trayectorias artilleras. Batalla de Alcañiz, 23 de mayo de 1809», en Actas del VI Congreso de Historia Militar. La Guerra de la Independencia Española: Una visión militar. Ministerio de Defensa, Madrid, 2009.
