= Battle of Belchite =

Battle of Belchite may refer to:

- Battle of Belchite (1809) during the Peninsular War
- Battle of Belchite (1937) during the Spanish Civil War
- Battle of Belchite (1938) during the Spanish Civil War
