= Seine-et-Oise =

Former department of France in Île-de-France

Coordinates: 48°48′N 2°08′E

Map of Seine-et-Oise in France, around Seine

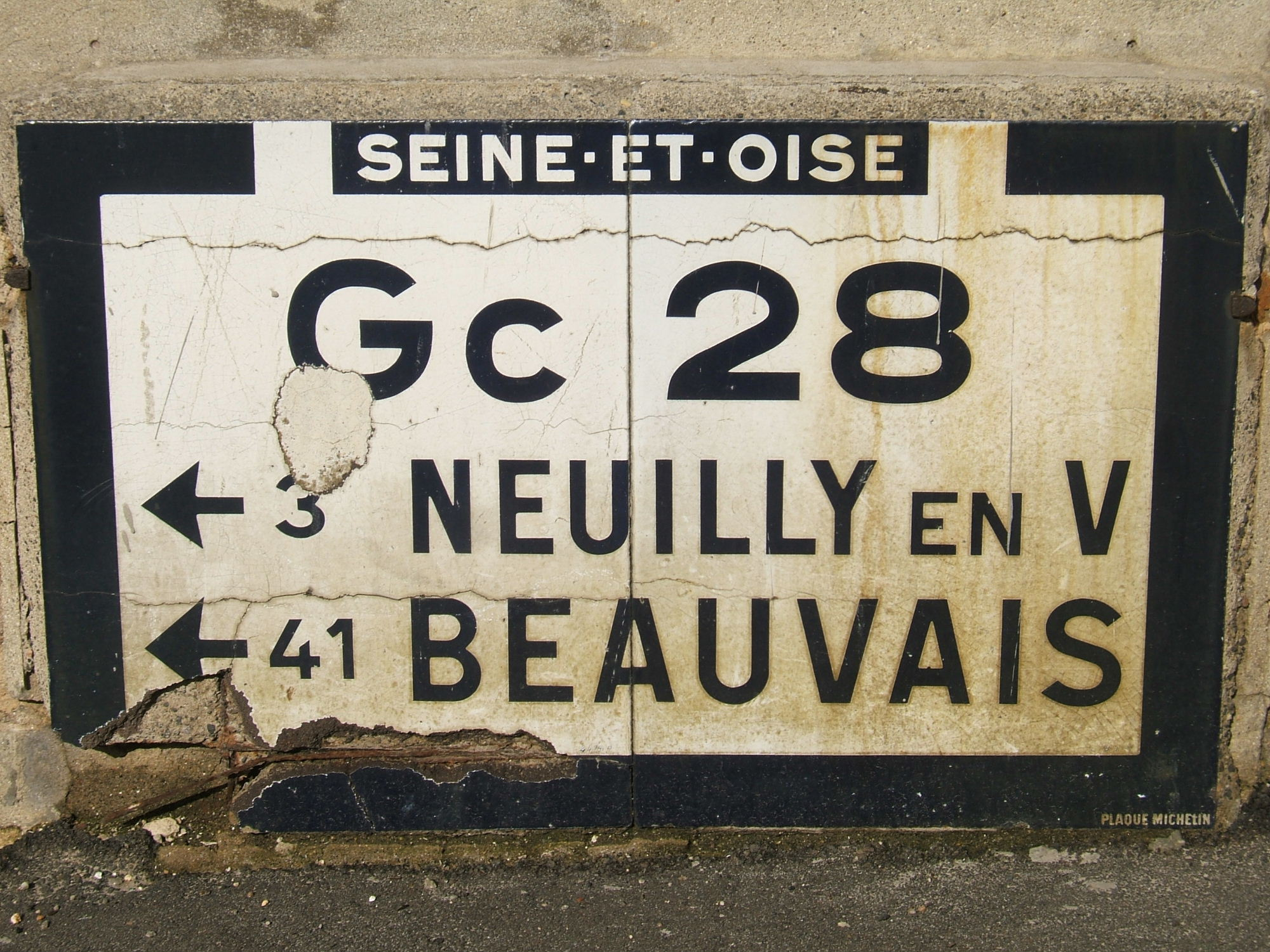
An old Michelin roadsign in Marines

Seine-et-Oise (French pronunciation: [sɛn‿e waz]) is a former department of France, which encompassed the western, northern and southern parts of the metropolitan area of Paris. Its prefecture was Versailles and its administrative number was 78. Seine-et-Oise was disbanded in 1968 as part of the reorganisation of the departments of the Paris metropolitan area. The newly created Yvelines department inherited the 78 number.

== General characteristics ==
Seine-et-Oise was created on 4 March 1790 during the French Revolution. Its name comes from the two main rivers (Seine River and Oise River) flowing through it. It completely surrounded the Seine department (which included Paris itself), although it was at its narrowest just east of Seine between that department and the Seine-et-Marne department, which still exists today.

At the time of its abolition in 1968, Seine-et-Oise consisted of 688 suburban and rural communes. It had an area of 5,658 square kilometres (2,185 sq mi). The division of Seine-et-Oise into arrondissements changed many times; the final change aligned arrondissement borders with those of its successor departments (Note: Those parts of Seine-et-Oise designated to form the Petite couronne departments of Hauts-de-Seine, Val-de-Marne, and Seine-Saint-Denis were each included in a canton, provisionally assigned to the arrondissements designated to form Yvelines, Essonne, and Val-d'Oise respectively, until the day of Seine-et-Oise's dissolution). For the last two decades of its existence before the preparations for its dissolution, it had five arrondissements: Corbeil, Mantes, Pontoise, Le Raincy, Rambouillet, and Versailles. At the moment of its dissolution it had ten arrondissements: Étampes, Évry, and Palaiseau, designated to form the Essonne department; Argenteuil, Montmorency, and Pontoise, designated to form the Val-d'Oise department; and Mantes, Rambouillet, Saint-Germain-en-Laye, and Versailles, designated to form the Yvelines department.

== Abolition ==
A map showing the extent of the departments of Seine-et-Oise (brown) and Seine (dark brown) before 1968, with the current department boundaries shown in black.

At the first French census in 1801, Seine-et-Oise had 421,535 inhabitants. With the growth of the Paris suburbs, the population of Seine-et-Oise increased markedly, and by 1968 it had reached 2,943,350 inhabitants, making it the second-largest French department behind only the Seine department. It was judged that Seine-et-Oise, along with the Seine department, had become too large to govern. On 1 January 1968, it was split into three smaller departments: Yvelines, Val-d'Oise, and Essonne. A small part of Seine-et-Oise was also merged with parts of the Seine department (also disbanded on the same date) to create the three new departments of Hauts-de-Seine, Val-de-Marne, and Seine-Saint-Denis.

In detail, the splitting up of the Seine-et-Oise department was carried out thus:

- The Yvelines department was created from 262 communes in the central part of the old Seine-et-Oise, with Versailles as the prefecture. The official number 78, which was used for Seine-et-Oise, was given to the new Yvelines department, which is the largest of the three (40% of the area of Seine-et-Oise).
- The Essonne department was created out of 198 communes in the south of the old Seine-et-Oise (32% of the area of Seine-et-Oise), and the official number 91 was assigned to this department, a number that had been previously used for the Alger department in French Algeria).
- The Val-d'Oise department was created out of 184 communes in the north of the old Seine-et-Oise (22% of the area of Seine-et-Oise), and the official number 95 was assigned to this department, a number that had never been used.

Of the remaining 6% of Seine-et-Oise, 18 communes were grouped with 29 communes of the Seine department to create the Val-de-Marne department, 16 communes of Seine-et-Oise were grouped with 24 communes of the Seine department to create the Seine-Saint-Denis department, and the last 9 communes of Seine-et-Oise were grouped with 27 communes of the Seine department to create the Hauts-de-Seine department.

Thus, Yvelines, Val-d'Oise, and Essonne together are smaller than the former Seine-et-Oise department (5,658 km^{2} for the Seine-et-Oise department vs. 5,334 km^{2} for the three departments).

== Grande couronne ==
The three departments of Yvelines, Essonne, and Val-d'Oise, plus the Seine-et-Marne department, are altogether known in France as the grande couronne ("large crown" or "large wreath"), as opposed to the petite couronne ("small crown" or "small wreath") of suburbs closer to Paris, largely in the new departments created in 1968 from the territory of Seine.

== Population ==
At the 1999 French census, the population of the former department of Seine-et-Oise was 4,554,426 inhabitants, its highest figure ever, as people relocated more and more from the center to the distant suburbs of the metropolitan area of Paris. Of the new departments created in 1968 from Seine-et-Oise, Yvelines was the most populous in 1999 with 1,354,304 residents. Seine-Saint-Denis and Hauts-de-Seine are more populous than Yvelines, but only a small part of their territory is made up of the former Seine-et-Oise.

== Notable people ==
- Jeanne-Mathilde Herbelin (1818–1904), portrait miniaturist

== See also ==
- Departments of France
