= Jeanne-Mathilde Herbelin =

French portrait miniaturist (1818–1904)

- Born: 24 August 1818; Seine-et-Oise, France
- Died: 4 April 1904 (aged 85); 8th arrondissement of Paris, France
- Father: Pierre-Joseph Habert
- Relatives: Jean-Hilaire Belloc (uncle)

Jeanne-Mathilde Herbelin (née Habert, 24 August 1818 – 4 April 1904) was a French portrait miniature painter.

== Biography ==
Herbelin was born on 24 August 1818 in Seine-et-Oise, France. Her parents were the French general of the Napoleonic Wars, Baron Pierre-Joseph Habert, and his wife Alice Belloc. She married Auguste Jules Herbelin c. 1840. Herbelin's maternal uncle was the French painter Jean-Hilaire Belloc and she benefited from being a member of his family by studying under him.

Herbelin was a portrait miniaturist. She exhibited from 1840 to 1877 at the Paris Salon. She obtained the medal of 3rd class at the Salon of 1843, the medal of the 2nd class at the Salon of 1844, and the medal of 1st class at the Salon of 1847 and 1848.

Herbelin later exhibited at the Exposition Universelle in 1855 and with the Société Nationale des Beaux-Arts in 1864. She painted the first miniature painting that was admitted to the Louvre art museum.

Herbelin died on 4 April 1904 in her home on the Rue de Monceau, 8th arrondissement of Paris, France.

== Gallery ==
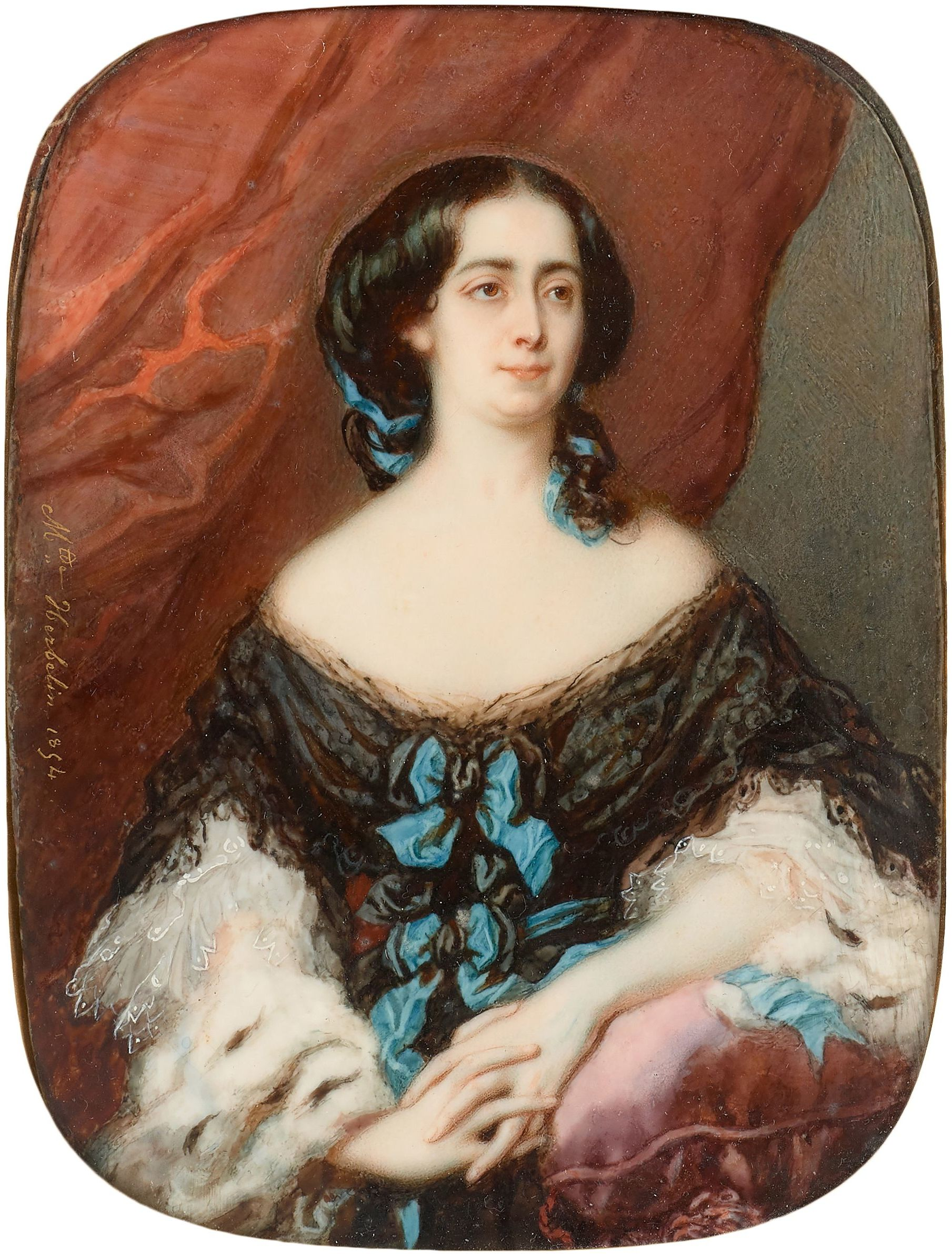
Portrait miniature of Comtesse Pernety (1854)

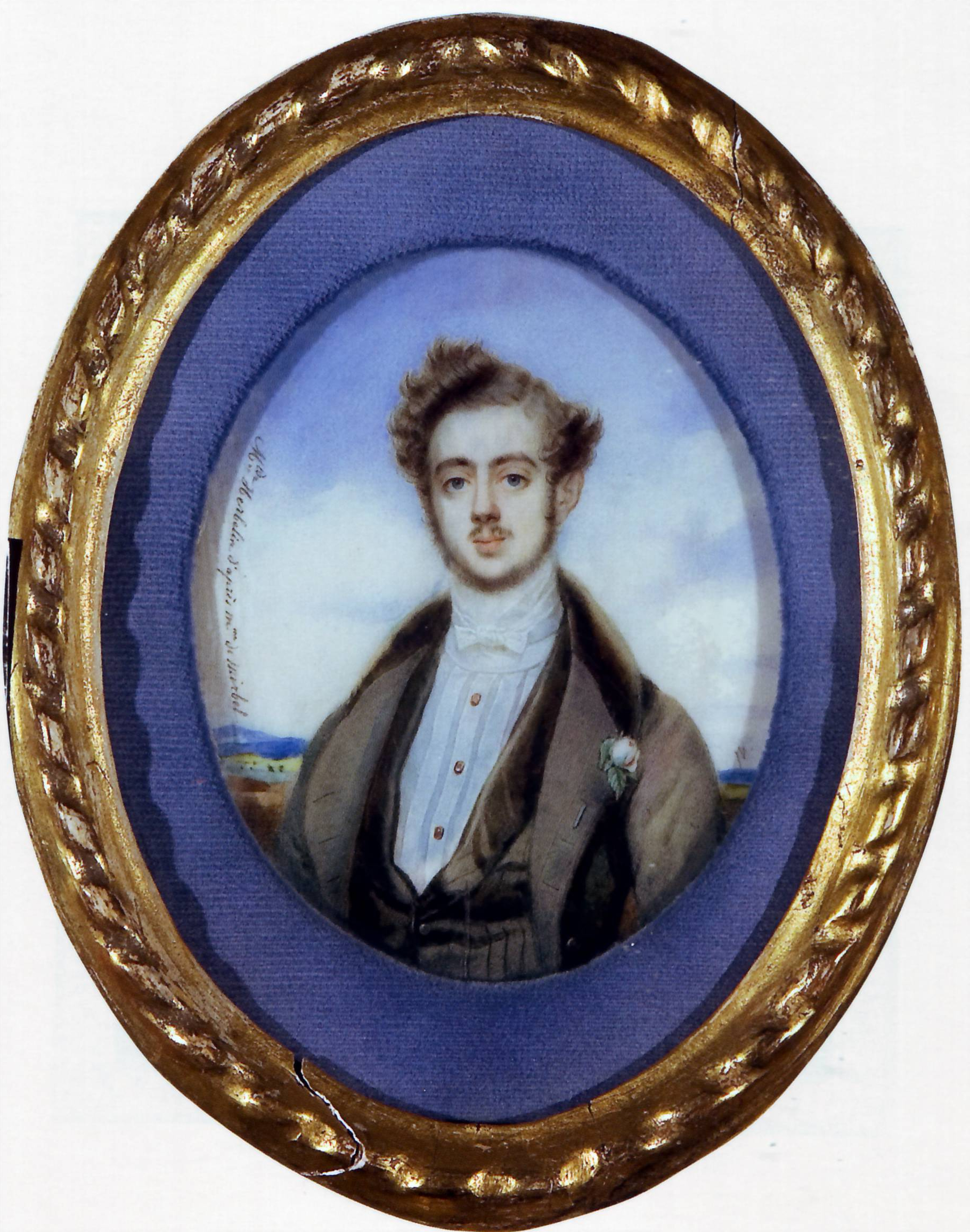
Portrait miniature of Anatoly Demidov, 1st Prince of San Donato (after Lizinska de Mirbel)
