= Siege of Mequinenza =

Action of the Peninsular War

- Part of Peninsular War
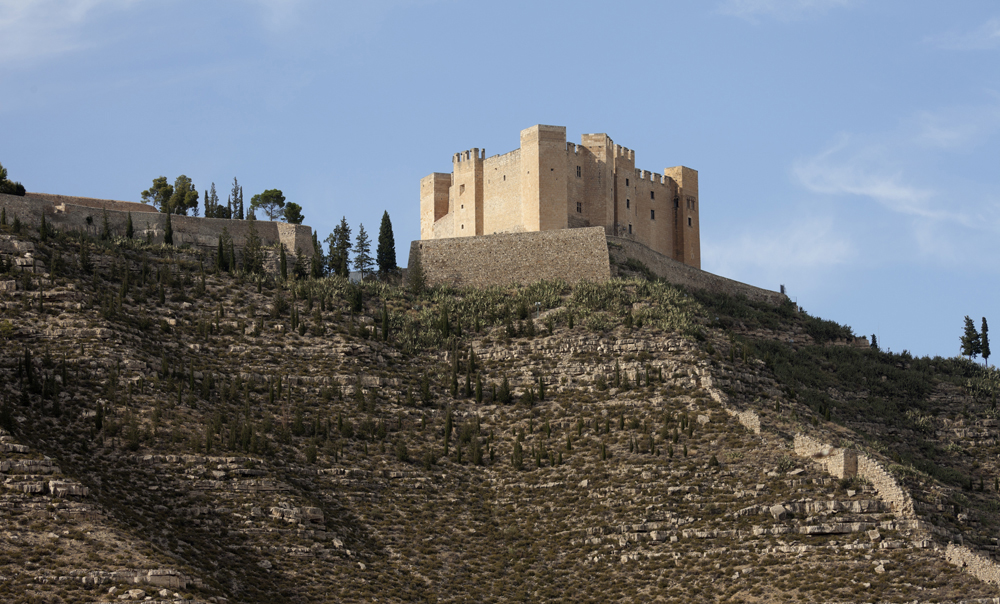
- Mequinenza Castle
Date	15 May to 8 June 1810
Location	Mequinenza, Aragon, Spain 41°22′0″N 0°18′0″E
Result	French victory

Belligerents
(France) First French Empire	Kingdom of Spain

Commanders and leaders
(France) Louis Gabriel Suchet	(Spain) Colonel Carbon

Units involved
(France) III Corps	(Spain) Army of Aragon

Strength
6,000	1,800

Casualties and losses
100	1,800

Peninsular War: Aragón Catalonia
current battle

The siege of Mequinenza (15 May to 8 June 1810) saw a 16,000-man Imperial French corps commanded by Louis Gabriel Suchet invest a 1,000-strong Spanish garrison under Colonel Carbon. Mequinenza and its castle were captured by the French after an operation lasting about three weeks. The action occurred during the Peninsular War, which formed part of the Napoleonic Wars. Mequinenza is located at the confluence of the Ebro and Segre Rivers about 211 kilometres (131 mi) west of Barcelona.

== Background ==
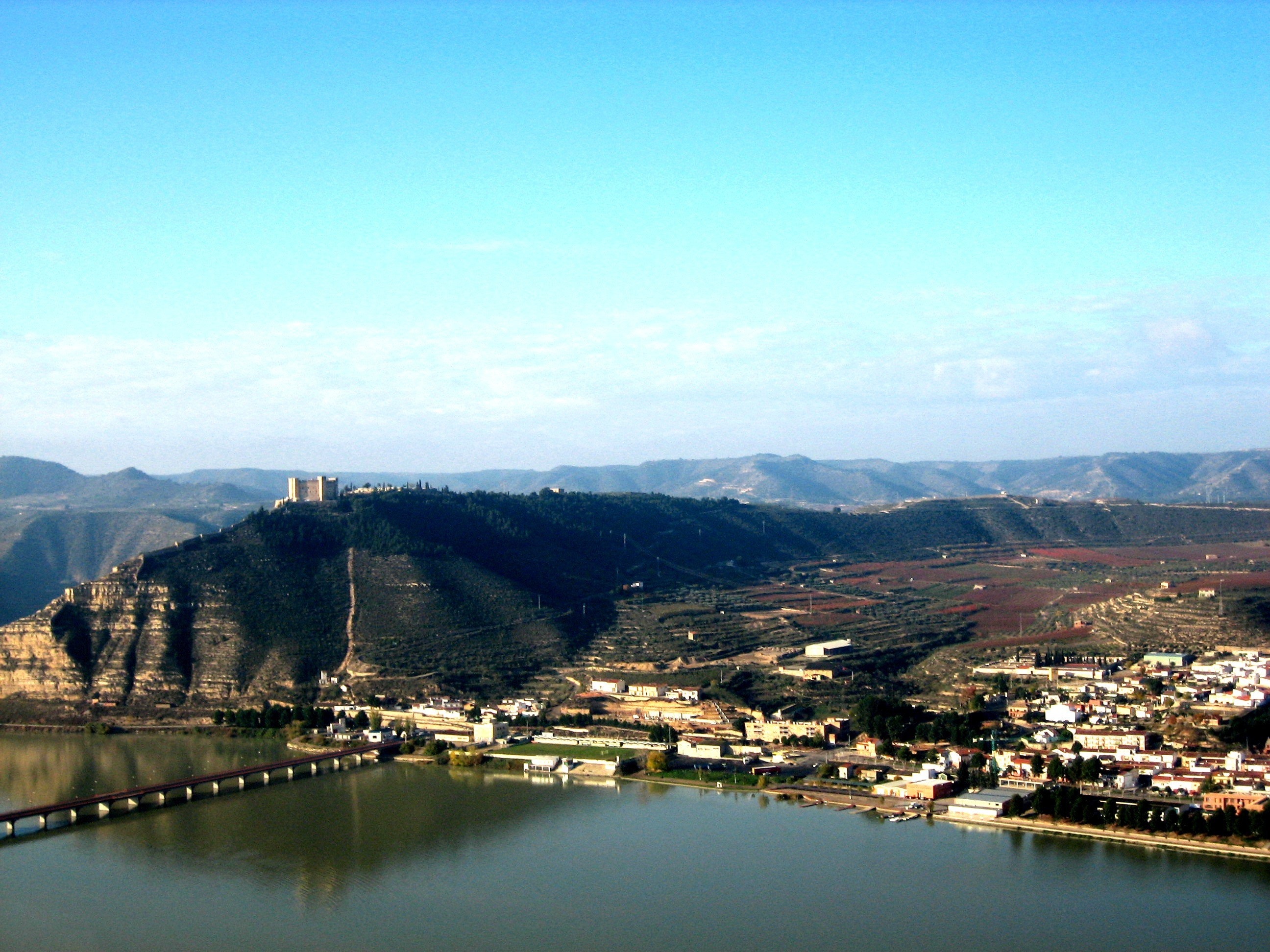
Mequinenza lies on the Segre, overlooked by a castle on a mountain spur. The Ebro flows from the west, unseen in the photo, down the valley behind the spur.

During the second siege of Zaragoza, its Spanish defenders bitterly resisted the French for many months. The city finally fell on 20 February 1809 and its large garrison was killed or captured. With most of Aragon's defenders wiped out, the French III Corps under General of Division Jean-Andoche Junot and V Corps under Marshal Édouard Mortier rapidly conquered the Ebro River valley. The powerful fortress of Jaca meekly surrendered to Mortier on 21 March 1809 and the towns of Monzón and Fraga were soon occupied. However, the castle of Mequinenza declined to surrender when summoned by a French column. After Mortier in person appeared before the castle with a brigade of infantry, its commander again refused to capitulate. The French marshal withdrew, planning to return after conquering the remainder of eastern Aragon. However, Emperor Napoleon issued orders on 5 April for the V Corps to withdraw to Tudela. The War of the Fifth Coalition was about to start and the emperor knew he might need Mortier's troops to reinforce his army in Germany. This left the III Corps to hold Aragon with only 15,000 troops. At the same time the emperor replaced Junot with General of Division Louis Gabriel Suchet.

== Siege ==
Mequinenza's town wall was old and weak, but its castle perched on a mountain spur above the town was a formidable position. It took Suchet's military engineers two weeks to construct a zig-zag road up the mountain. Once the road was ready, the French dragged their siege cannons to the top and opened fire on the castle. The town was successfully stormed on 5 June. After eight days of bombardment the castle was a ruin and Carbon surrendered. Since Mequinenza was at the head of navigation on the Ebro, Suchet was able to use the town as a supply base in his subsequent operations during the siege of Tortosa in the winter of 1810 and 1811.
