= Castle of Barbacena =

Medieval castle in Elvas, Portugal

- Castelo de Barbacena
- Portalegre, Alto Alentejo, Algarve in Portugal
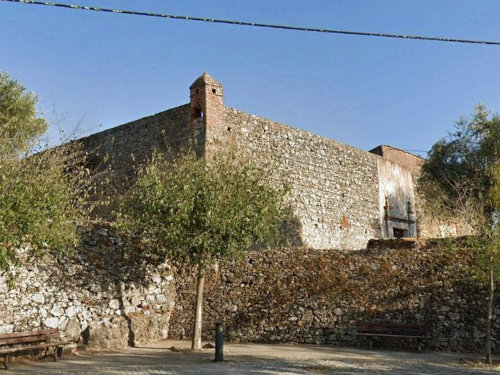

Site information
- Type: Castle
- Owner: Portuguese Republic
- Operator: Private
- Open to the public: Public

Location
- Location of the castro in the municipality of Elvas
- Coordinates: 38°57′37″N 7°17′37″W

Site history
- Built: 15th century
- Materials: Stone, Masonry, Wood, Tile, Calcium oxide

The Castle of Barbacena (Portuguese: Castelo de Barbacena/Fortificações de Barbacena) is a former-medieval castle/fort in the civil parish of Barbacena e Vila Fernando, municipality of Elvas in the Portuguese Alentejo, classified as a Property of Public Interest (Imóvel de Interesse Público).

== History ==
The settlement of Barbacena was definitively reconquered by King D. Sancho II, in the first half of the 13th century. The settlement of the site, which possibly developed from a pre-Roman castro, developed from its gift to D. Estêvão Anes, chancellor of King D. Afonso III (who was married to the illegitimate daughter of the monarch, and Master of Alvito in 1251. The first foral was signed by its new master in 1273, still in the reign of King Afonso. During the reign of King D. John I, there is reference to two partisan noblemen, João Fernandes Pacheco and Martim Afonso de Melo. The latter was the king's bodyguard (guarda-mor) and alcalde of Évora, to whom was later granted the lordship of Barbacena. João Fernandes Pacheco, who was a supporter of the Master of Avis, lost this and other lordships for betraying the King, and Barbacena was given to Martim Afonso de Melo.

On 15 December 1519, D. Manuel I provided the town with a new foral, ordering the re-construction of the castle, which it can be assumed was in a bad state of repair. A few years later, in 1536, Barbacena was a morgadio of D. Jorge Henriques, huntsman to King D. John III, to whom was attributed the beginning of the construction of the castle, but this terminated on the death of its founder, in 1572. Three years later, the fortification was purchased by Diogo de Castro do Rio, Knight in the Order of Christ and Nobleman in the Royal House, who was the first to use the title Master of Barbacena. At this time, the castle was already erected, following a rectangular layout, on the site of a previous medieval project. It was short-lived: in 1587, the morgadio was once again auctioned off to Martim de Castro, under the condition of removing the two corbels and the keep tower.

In the 17th century, during the context of the Restoration Wars, the fortress underwent public works in order to improve its strategic worth, resulting in the construction of a modern bastion. The principal entranceway, which included a stone portico and frontispiece with sculpted pinnacles, was constructed during this era. In 1645, Castilian forces assaulted the castle and in 1658 the garrison was forced to surrender to the Duke of Ossuna. Constant attacks and pillaging, as well as a need to modernize its defenses and improve its strategic worth, resulted in moves by Afonso Furtado de Mendonça (the king's chancellor and first Viscount of Barbacena, great-grandson of Diogo de Castro do Rio) to elaborate new plans. New attacks on the bastion then occurred, by the Marquês of Bay, governor of Badajoz, during the War of the Spanish Succession. Barbacena was actually besieged several times in the 19th century, and its proximity to Spain was a cause of considerable instability, due to Spanish incursions.

Of the original rectangular castle, there are remains of the walls and principal entrance, in addition to vestiges of the arched old gate (which was covered over). The fortification walls were transformed in the 17th century into a star-shaped bastion, with several of the walls and barbicans remaining. The keep tower was destroyed at the beginning of the 17th century. Still visible is the House of the Governor (Portuguese: Casa do Governador), a nobleman's residence, with central staircase and vestiges of a chapel on the upper floor.

The castle continued in the same family for several years. In 1816, King D. John VI created the title of Count of Barbacena, to the benefit of Luís António Furtado de Castro do Rio de Mendonça e Faro, 1st Count and 6th Viscount of Barbacena. His son, Francisco Furtado de Castro do Rio de Mendonça, 2nd Count and 7th Viscount of Barbacena, continued to live at the castle. In 1896, as recorded in a property notice, Hermenegildo José Costa Campos sold it to Alfredo de Andrade, whose descendant José Luis Sommer de Andrade, sold it in 2005 to Mico da Câmara Pereira.

In 1974, the fortifications were occupied by the population of Barbacena.

== Architecture ==
The site consists of a garrison castle within a star-shaped bastion fortress. The bastion fortress consists of an arrow-shaped revelim (with entrance to the southwest), a half bastion, recessed walls and two middle bastions (interconnected by advanced arrow-shaped revelim) with guardhouse. The rectangular-shaped castle includes battlements that circle the rooftops that were transformed into simple parapets. On the eastern walls are rectangular bastions, while opposite to these are large circular towers, with vaulted ground and top floors that incorporate window slits (some horizontal).

The courtyard has central cistern, two abandoned cannons and annex buildings.

To the east, is the House of the Governor, a two-story building serviced by a central staircase that connects the ground floor to the circular tower (on the outer wall). On the upper floor (in the north) are traces of a chapel integrated into the battlement and house's wall.

The main gate includes rectangular masonry mould, with framing pilasters and pediment with decorative base relief features. The old door, with moulded bases, has a semicircular stone arch within a rectangular frame and an architrave supporting two pinnacles (coruchéu) flanking a rectangular niche.

In August 2026, the restoration of the castle began. It will be used as a boutique hotel and restaurant.
