= Battle of Alcañiz =

1809 battle during the Peninsular War

- Part of the Peninsular War
- Battle of Alcañiz (Spain)
Date	23 May 1809
Location	Alcañiz, west of Teruel, Spain 41°02′57″N 0°08′50″W
Result	Spanish victory

Belligerents
(First French Empire) French Empire	Kingdom of Spain

Commanders and leaders
(First French Empire) Louis Gabriel Suchet	Joaquín Blake y Joyes; Martín García-Loygorri

Strength
8,000	9,000

Casualties and losses
700 dead or wounded	300 dead or wounded

Peninsular War: Aragón Catalonia
current battle

The Battle of Alcañiz resulted in the defeat of Major-General Louis Gabriel Suchet's French army on 23 May 1809 by a Spanish force under General Joaquín Blake y Joyes.

The victory is credited to General Martín García-Loygorri's superb command of the Spanish artillery, which allowed the French columns to close and then mauled them with well-directed salvos. Loygorri was later promoted to Field Marshal and became the first artillery officer ever to receive the Laureate Cross of Saint Ferdinand.

== Background ==
The Spanish campaign in early 1809 started with the Battle of Uclés.

== Forces ==
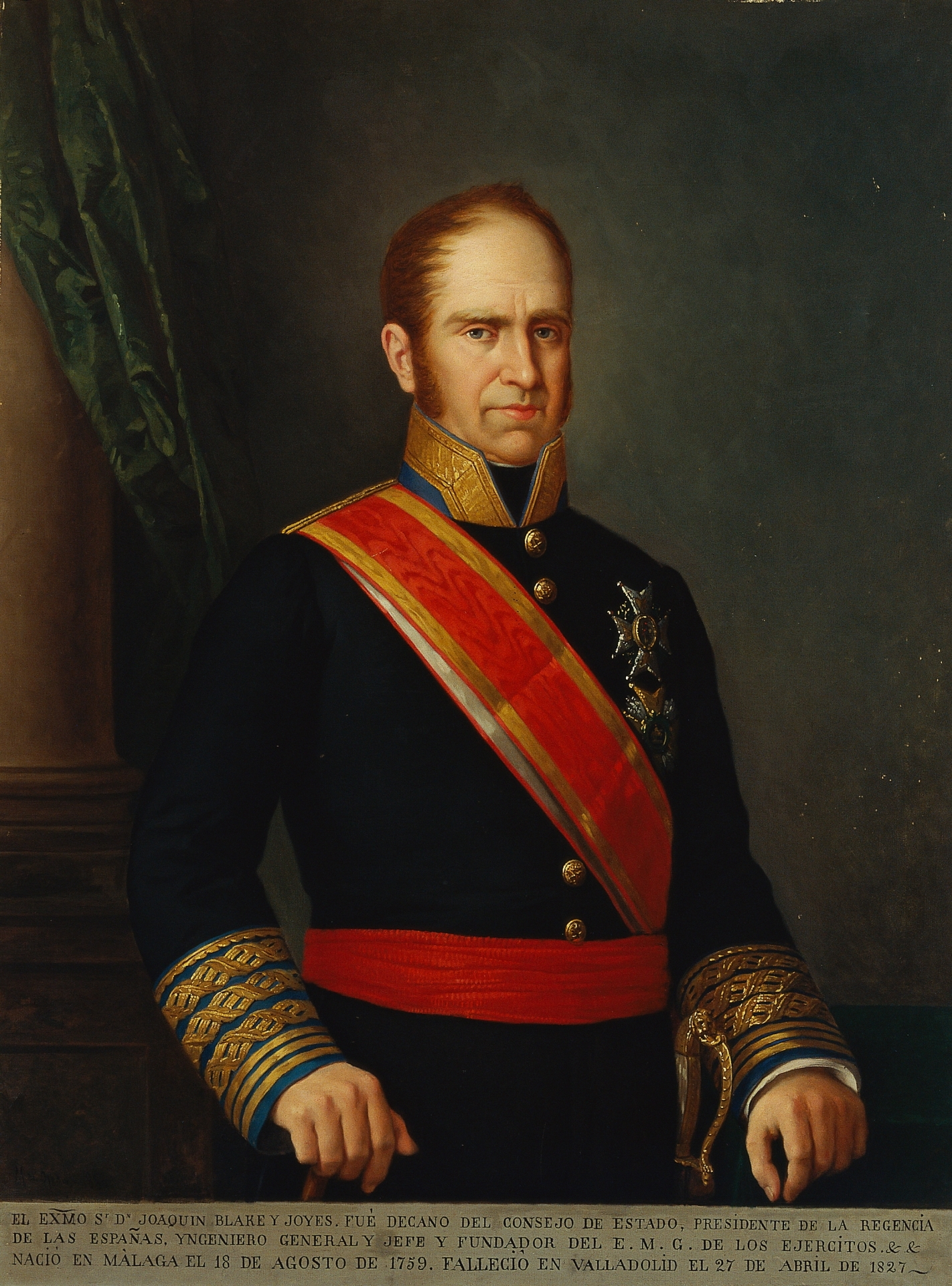
Spanish General Joaquín Blake y Joyes.

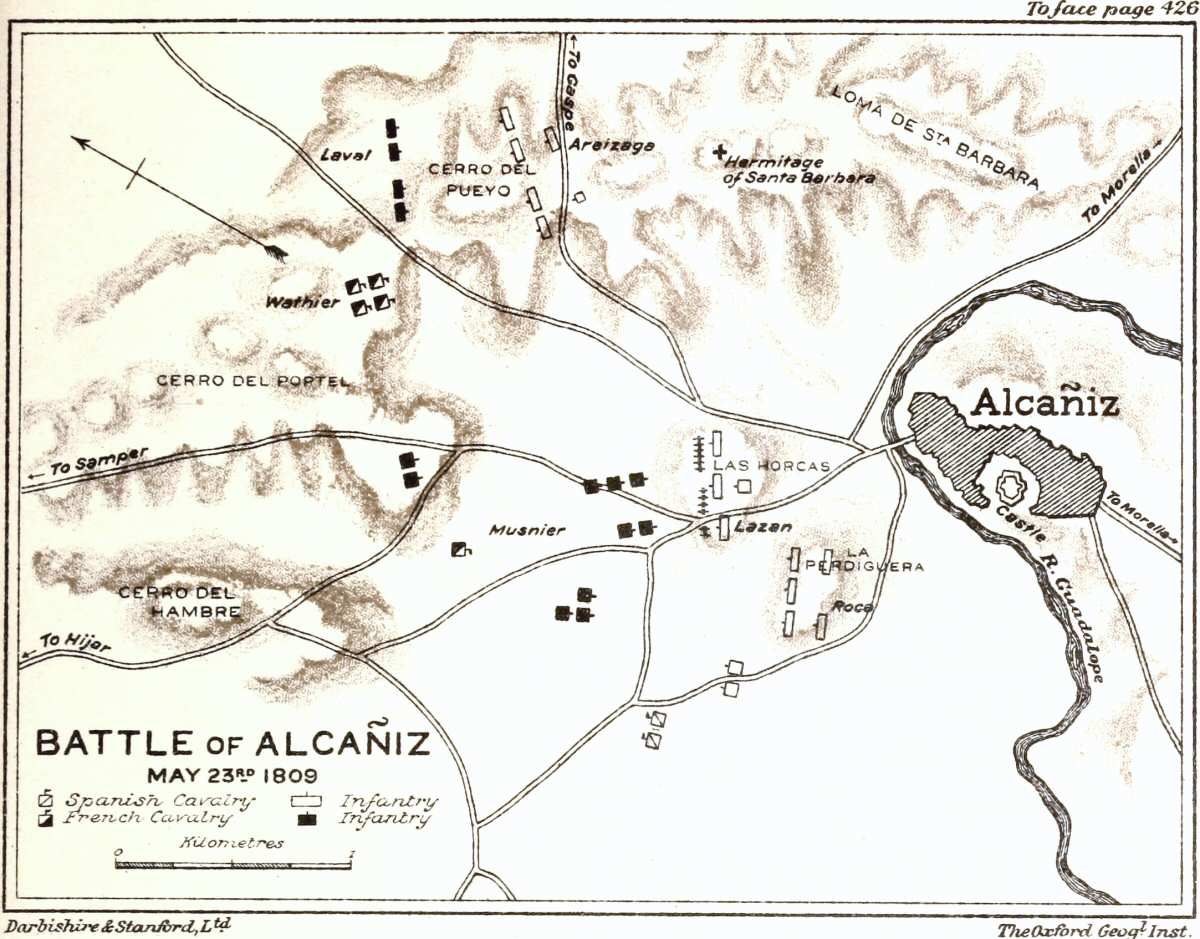
Map of the battle

General of Division Suchet's III Corps included 7,292 men in two infantry divisions, 18 cannon and 526 cavalrymen. The 1st Division, under General of Division Anne-Gilbert Laval, had two battalions each of the 14th Line and the 3rd Legion of the Vistula (Poles). General of Division Louis François Félix Musnier's 2nd Division was made up of three battalions each of the 114th and 115th Line, two battalions of the 1st Legion of the Vistula, and one battalion of the 121st Line. Suchet also had a bodyguard of 450 infantrymen. The 4th Hussars and 13th Cuirassier Regiments formed the cavalry.

Lieutenant General Blake formed his men into three wings, which were roughly equivalent to divisions. General Areizaga commanded the Left Wing (five battalions, plus one company), General Marquis de Lazan (five and one-half battalions) led the Center and General Roca managed the Right Wing (seven battalions). In addition to the 8,101 foot soldiers, the Spanish army had 445 cavalrymen and 19 cannons.

== Results ==
Suchet lost over 800 men killed and wounded, while Spanish casualties numbered only about 300. The Spanish victory caused Suchet to evacuate most of Aragon. Blake secured 25,000 new recruits, so many that he could not provide them all with weapons. Suchet avenged his defeat at the Battle of María in June.

== Aftermath ==
The Spanish campaign in early 1809 proceeded with the French advance in Catalonia in the Battle of María.

== Notes ==
Preceded by Battle of Aspern-Essling	Napoleonic Wars; Battle of Alcañiz	Succeeded by Battle of Sankt Michael
