= Louis-Gabriel Suchet =

French Marshal (1770–1826)

Marshal of the Empire Louis Gabriel Suchet duc d’Albuféra
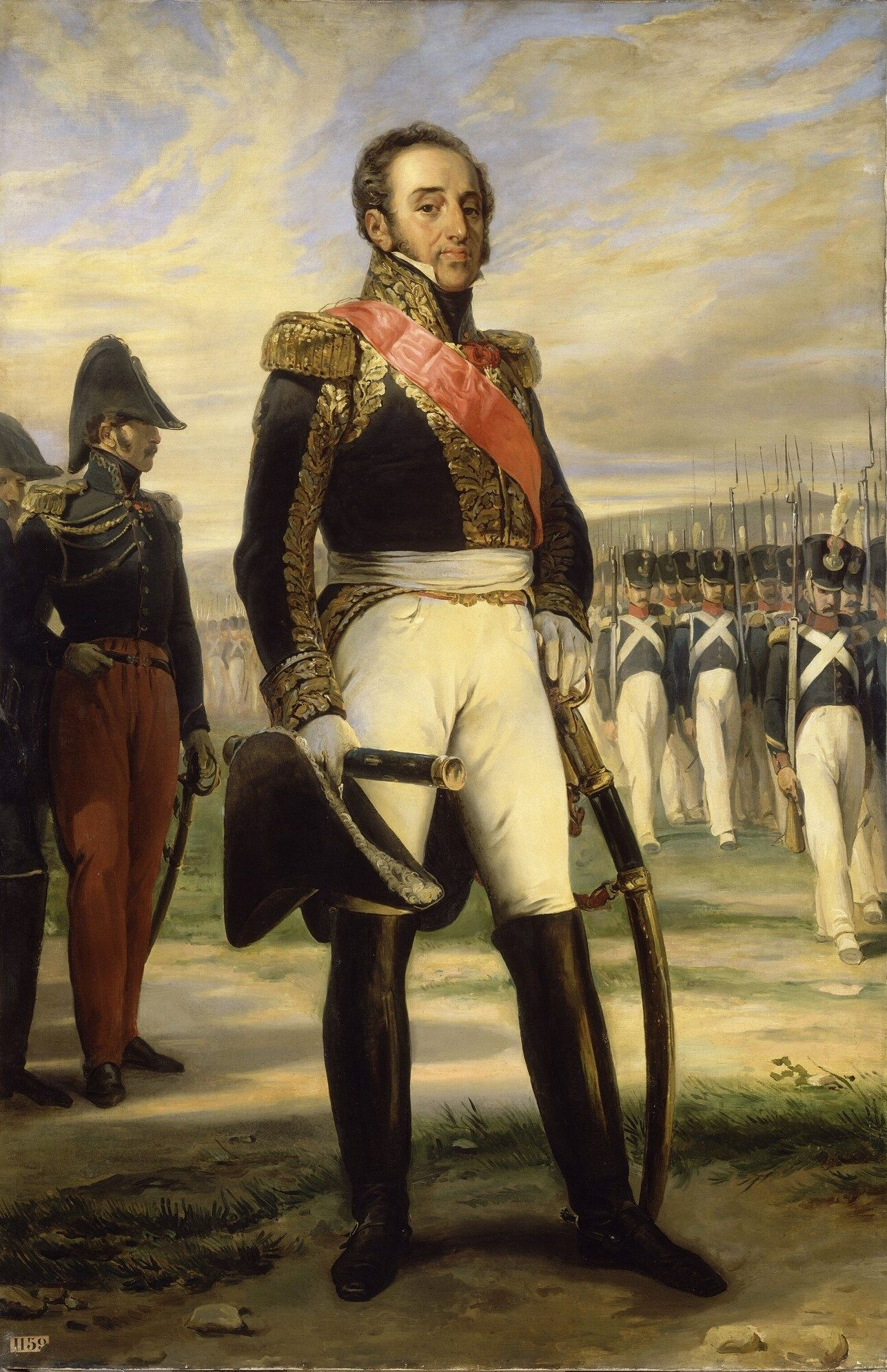
- Portrait by Jean-Baptiste Paulin Guérin
- Born: 2 March 1770; Lyon, France
- Died: 3 January 1826 (aged 55); Marseille, France
- Military career
- Branch: French Army
- Service years: 1792–1815
- Rank: Marshal of the Empire
- Conflicts: See list: War of the First Coalition; Siege of Toulon; Battle of Loano; Second Battle of Dego; Battle of Lodi; Battle of Borghetto; Battle of Castiglione; Battle of Bassano; Battle of Arcole; Battle of Rivoli; Battle of Tarvis; French invasion of Switzerland; War of the Second Coalition; Battle of Novi; Genoa campaign; Battle of Pozzolo; War of the Third Coalition; Battle of Ulm; Battle of Schöngrabern; Battle of Austerlitz; War of the Fourth Coalition; Battle of Saalfeld; Battle of Jena-Auerstedt; Battle of Pułtusk; Battle of Ostrołęka; Battle of Eylau; Peninsular War; Siege of Zaragoza; Battle of Alcañiz; Battle of María; Battle of Belchite; Siege of Lérida; Siege of Mequinenza; Siege of Tortosa; Siege of Tarragona (1811); Battle of Montserrat; Battle of Saguntum; Siege of Valencia; Battle of Castalla; Siege of Tarragona (1813); Battle of Ordal; War of the Seventh Coalition
- Awards: Grand Cross of the Legion of Honour

Louis-Gabriel Suchet, duc d'Albuféra (English: /ˈsuːʃeɪ/ SOO-shay, French: [lwi ɡabʁijɛl syʃɛ]; 2 March 1770 – 3 January 1826), was a French Marshal of the Empire and one of the most successful commanders of the French Revolutionary and Napoleonic Wars. During the Peninsular War (part of the Napoleonic Wars), he was remembered as a skilled administrator. He is placed among the greatest commanders of the Napoleonic Wars.

== Early life ==
Suchet was born on 2 March 1770 in Lyon, the son of Jean-Pierre Suchet and Anne-Marie Jacquier. His mother died four years later. His father was a silk merchant, and Suchet originally intended to follow a business career. He received a solid education and joined his father's business in 1787, working as an apprentice for two years.

Upon Jean-Pierre's death in January 1789, Suchet and his brother Gabriel-Catherine took over the family enterprise, which they decided to expand under the name Maison Suchet frères. However, the French Revolution led Suchet to volunteer, in 1791, for the cavalry of the National Guard at Lyon. He displayed abilities which secured rapid military promotions, and by 1792 he was a captain of the volunteers from Ardèche.

== French Revolutionary Wars ==
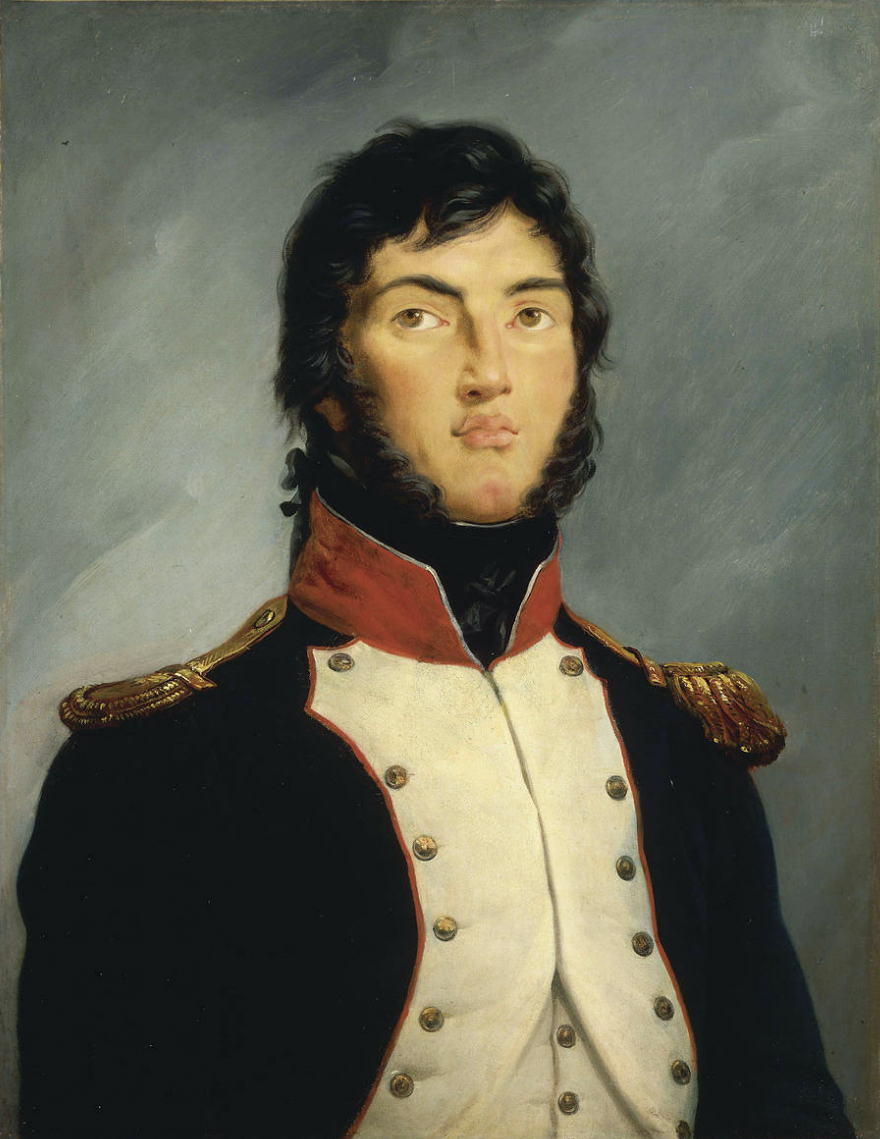
Suchet as a lieutenant-colonel of the 4th Ardèche Battalion in 1792, by Vincent-Nicolas Raverat (1834)

After the Levée en masse of August 1793, Suchet was appointed commander of the 4th Ardèche Battalion. In this capacity he served in the Siege of Toulon, where he captured British General Charles O'Hara. In May 1794, at the head of 250 soldiers of his battalion, he suppressed a counter-revolutionary uprising in the town of Bédoin in southeastern France. Suchet was then sent to the Army of Italy, where he would serve for most of the next seven years. He fought at the Battle of Loano in November 1795 during the army's first campaign. During the Italian campaign of 1796–1797, he served with distinction at the battles of Lodi, Castiglione, and Bassano. He went to Paris on leave after being severely wounded on 11 October at Cerea, but soon returned to the army.

In May 1797, Suchet was one of three lieutenant colonels of the 18th Infantry Demi-brigade, with little hope of advancement. He was sent to Venice to procure uniforms for the troops. Since the Venetians believed that they might in future be ruled by the French, Suchet and an aide were treated like royalty. For two months, they enjoyed living in a palace, having a personal gondola and holding reserved seats at the opera. On 28 October 1797, 150 officers of André Masséna's division hosted a large dinner. The colonel of the 32nd Line, Dominique Martin Dupuy brought Suchet to Napoleon Bonaparte's table and said, "Well general, when will you make our friend Suchet a colonel?" Bonaparte tried to brush him off with the reply, "Soon: we will see about it." Thereupon Dupuy took off one of his epaulettes and placed it on Suchet's shoulder, saying, "By my almightiness, I make thee colonel." This clownish action was successful; Bonaparte immediately directed Louis-Alexandre Berthier to write out Suchet's nomination for advancement.

Suchet received the command of the 18th half-brigade (demi-brigade) on 26 October 1797. In March 1798, he served under General Guillaume Brune in the invasion of Switzerland. At the end of the campaign, he was promoted to brigade general and was given the honor of presenting the flags captured from the enemy to the Directory. Although designated to take part in the expedition to Egypt, Brune kept Suchet’s services and appointed him his chief of staff in the Army of Italy, a role that he retained under General Barthélemy Joubert, Brune's successor as commander in Italy and Suchet's friend. He was appointed chief of staff of the Army of the Danube on 21 February 1799, but soon rejoined Joubert in Italy and was promoted to general of division. After Joubert's death at the Battle of Novi, Suchet continued to serve as chief of staff to his successors Moreau and Championnet.

In 1800, Suchet was named second-in-command to General André Masséna. His dexterous resistance to the superior forces of the Austrians with the left wing of Masséna's army, when the right and centre were besieged in Genoa, not only prevented the invasion of France from this direction but contributed to the success of Bonaparte's crossing of the Alps, leading to a decisive victory at the Battle of Marengo on 14 June. Following the signing of the Convention of Alessandria on 15 June, Suchet was entrusted with the administration of Genoa and Lucca. He took a prominent part in the subsequent of the Italian campaign up to the Armistice of Treviso, and thereafter served as governor of Padua until the Peace of Lunéville and the end of the War of the Second Coalition. He was appointed Inspector-General of the Infantry on 24 July 1801.

== Napoleonic Wars ==
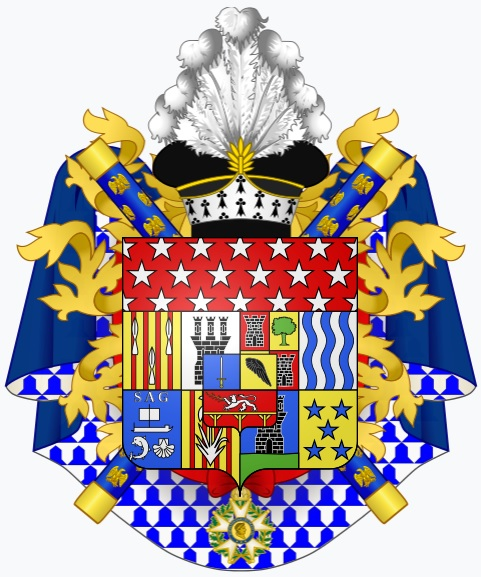
Heraldic achievement of Louis-Gabriel Suchet, Duke of Albuféra

Suchet greatly enhanced his reputation during the Napoleonic Wars. In 1804, during the War of the Third Coalition, he commanded the 4th division of Marshal Soult's IV Corps and distinguished himself at the battles of Ulm and Austerlitz. He served under Marshal Lannes in the V Corps in 1806, during the War of the Fourth Coalition, and fought at the battles of Saalfeld, Jena, Pułtusk, and Ostrolenka.

In the subsequent negotiations of the Treaties of Tilsit, Suchet worked with Russian generals Tolstoy and Wittgenstein on the settlement of the borders of the new Duchy of Warsaw. He was named a Count of the Empire on 24 June 1808. Two months later, Suchet was stationed to Silesia as commander-in-chief of the V Corps.

=== Peninsular War ===
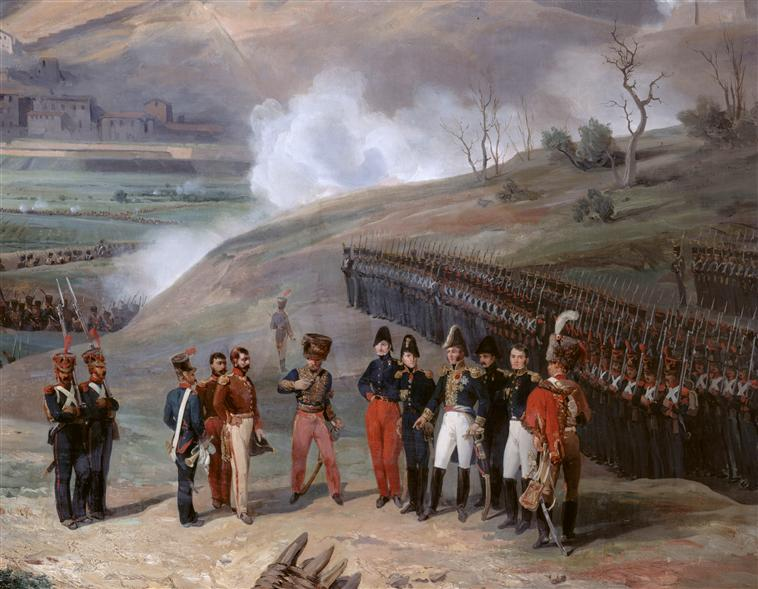
Suchet receiving the surrender of Tortosa on 2 January 1811 (detail), by Jean-Charles-Joseph Rémond (c. 1836)

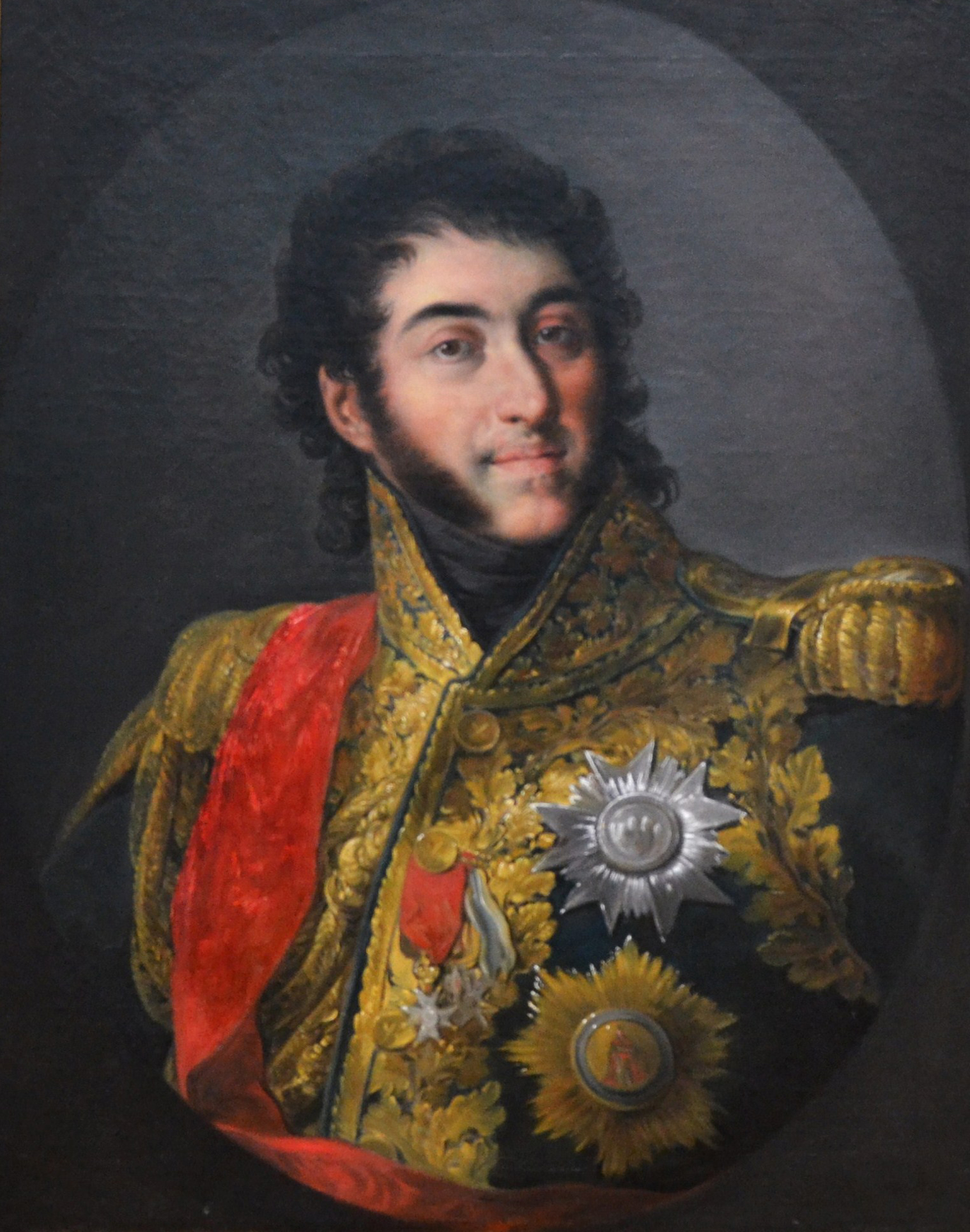
Portrait of Marshal Suchet in Spain by Vicente López Portaña, c. 1813

Suchet was deployed to Spain in November 1808. After serving in the Siege of Zaragoza, in April 1809 he was appointed commander of the Army of Aragon and governor of that region. Within two years, he brought the area into complete submission by wise and skillful administration no less than by his valor. Beaten by the Spanish at the Battle of Alcañiz on 23 May 1809, he defeated the army of Blake y Joyes at the Battle of María on 14 June 1809. On 22 April 1810, he defeated O'Donnell at the Siege of Lérida, then laid siege to Mequinenza in May.

He captured Tortosa on 2 January 1811. For his successful Siege of Tarragona from May to June 1811, Suchet was made a Marshal of the Empire by Napoleon on 8 July 1811. He then launched an invasion of the region of Valencia, defeated Blake y Joyes at the Battle of Saguntum on 15 October, and received the capitulation of Valencia on 9 January 1812. He was rewarded with the title of duc d'Albuféra (Duke of Albuféra) on 24 January 1812.

After the tide turned against France, Suchet managed to defend his territories in eastern Spain until the French defeat at Vitoria on 21 June 1813, after which he was forced to evacuate Valencia. He withdrew to Catalonia, defeating the Anglo-Spanish force here at the Battle of Ordal, then to the Pyrenees before finally re-entering France, and afterwards took part in the defense of southwestern France until Napoleon's abdication in April 1814.

== Hundred Days and later life ==
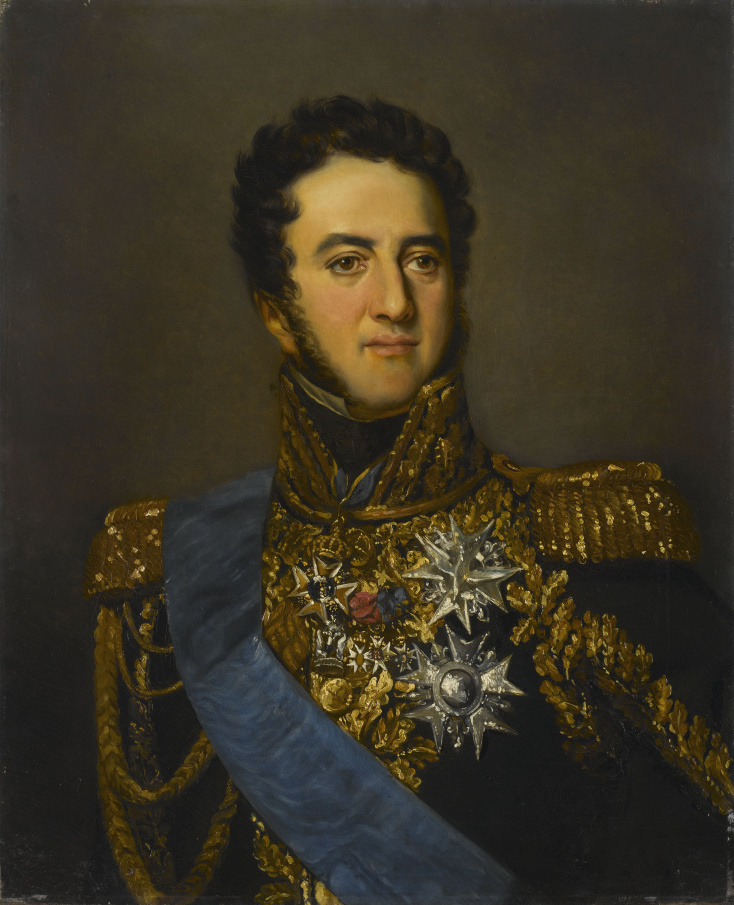
Suchet wearing the sash of the Order of the Holy Spirit

Suchet accepted the Bourbon Restoration and was made a peer of France on 4 June 1814 by King Louis XVIII. This was forfeited (effective 24 July 1815) by his support of Napoleon's return during the Hundred Days. During Napoleon's brief restoration, Suchet was given command of the Army of the Alps and led the defensive campaign on the southeastern front. He resisted the Allies' advance for nearly two months before withdrawing to his hometown of Lyon, where he signed an armistice on 12 July.

Suchet was only restored to the Chamber of Peers on 5 March 1819. Unlike other marshals whom Napoleon harshly criticized in Saint Helena, Suchet never lost Napoleon's high esteem. He died on 3 January 1826 at the Château de Saint-Joseph-Montredon, now called Château de Saint-Just, near Marseille. His son, Louis-Napoléon (1813–1877), succeeded him as Duc d'Albufera.

== Legacy ==
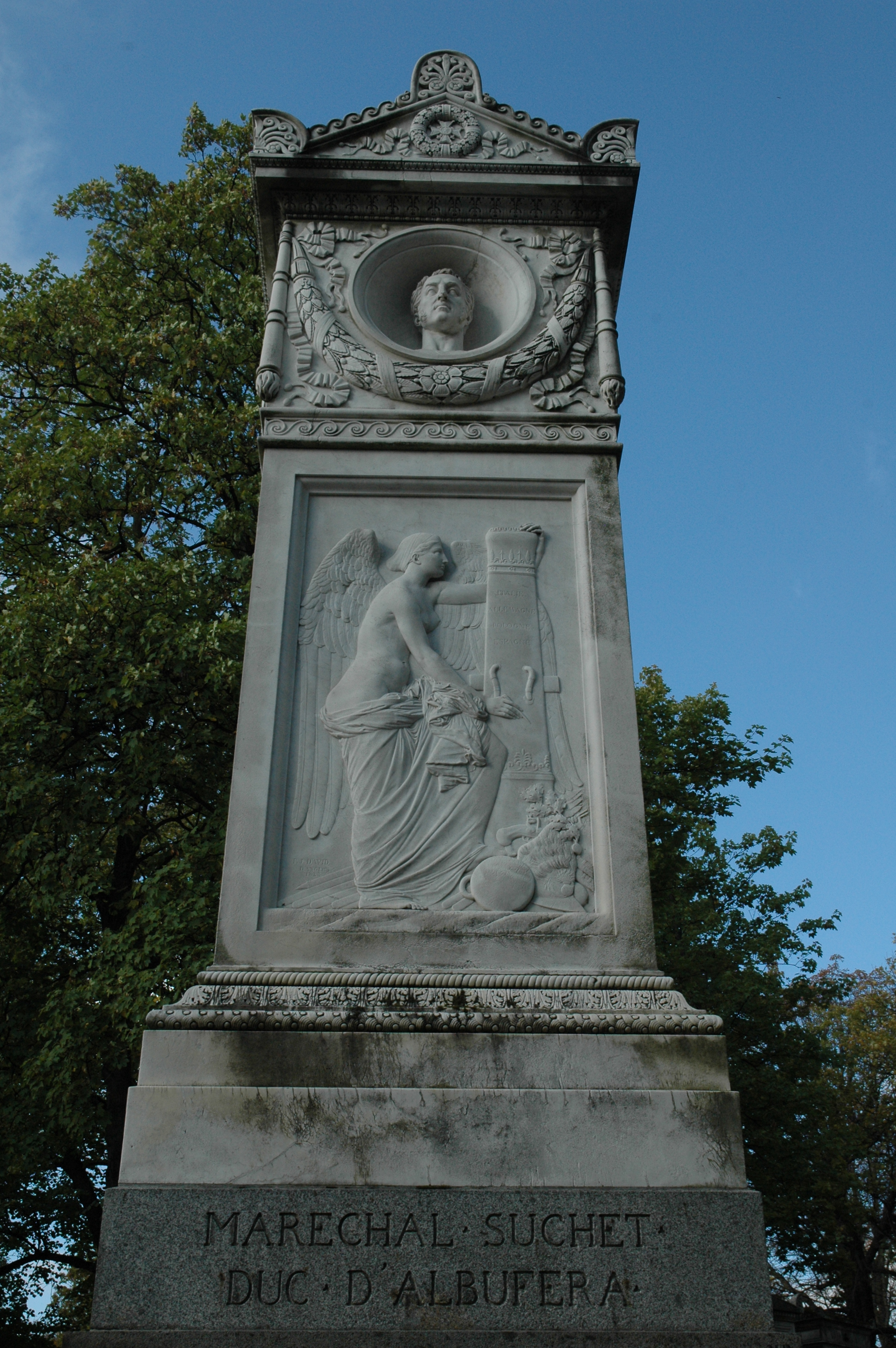
Suchet's grave in the Père Lachaise Cemetery, Paris

His memoirs (Mémoires sur Ses Campagnes en Espagne) were published in two volumes from 1829 to 1834.

The chicken dish poularde à la d'Albuféra is named after him.

== Family ==
Suchet married Honorine Anthoine de Saint-Joseph (Marseille, 26 February 1790 – Paris, 13 April 1884), a niece of Julie Clary, the wife of Joseph Bonaparte, on 16 November 1808. They had three children:

- Louise-Honorine (1811 – 1885)
- Louis-Napoléon (1813 – 1877)
- [daughter, unknown name] (1820 – 1835)

== See also ==
- List of French generals of the Revolutionary and Napoleonic Wars
- Asensio Nebot
