= Battle of María =

1809 battle during the Peninsular War

- Part of the Peninsular War
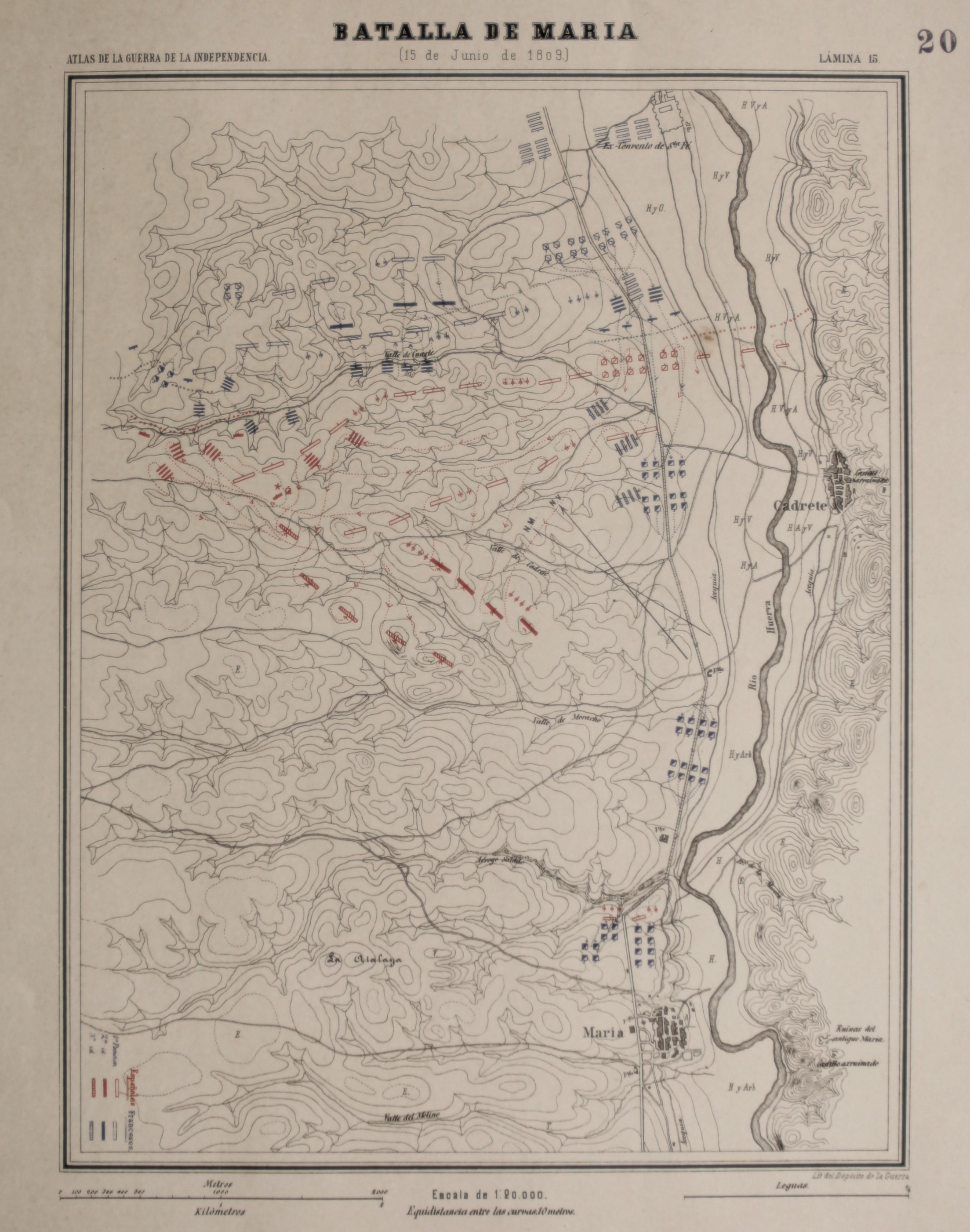
- Spanish map of the battle (1868)
Date	15 June 1809
Location	María de Huerva, Spain 41.5522°N 0.9919°W
Result	French victory

Belligerents
(France) First French Empire	Kingdom of Spain

Commanders and leaders
(First French Empire) Louis Gabriel Suchet	(Spain) Joaquín Blake

Units involved
III Corps	Army of Aragon

Strength
11,300; 12 guns	20,000; 23 guns

Casualties and losses
800	4,500; 20 guns

Peninsular War: Aragón Catalonia
current battle

The Battle of María (15 June 1809) saw a small Spanish army led by Joaquín Blake y Joyes face an Imperial French corps under Louis Gabriel Suchet.

== Background ==
The Spanish campaign in early 1809 started with the Battle of Uclés.

== Battle ==
After an inconclusive contest earlier in the day, Suchet's cavalry made a decisive charge that resulted in a French victory. Though the Spanish right wing was crushed, the rest of Blake's army got away in fairly good order after abandoning most of its artillery. María de Huerva is located 17 kilometres (10.6 mi) southwest of Zaragoza, Spain. The action occurred during the Peninsular War which was part of the larger struggle known as the Napoleonic Wars.

== Aftermath ==
The Spanish campaign in early 1809 proceeded with the French advance in Catalonia in the Battle of Belchite.

== Notes ==
Preceded by Battle of Raab	Napoleonic Wars; Battle of María	Succeeded by Battle of Graz
