= III Corps (Grande Armée) =

Military unit of Grande Armée

- Active: 1805–1807; 1812–1814; 1815
- Country: First French Empire
- Branch: French Imperial Army
- Size: Corps
- Part of: Grande Armée
- Engagements: War of the Third Coalition; War of the Fourth Coalition; Russian campaign War of the Sixth Coalition; War of the Seventh Coalition

Commanders
- Notable commanders: Louis-Nicolas Davout; Michel Ney; Joseph Souham; Dominique Vandamme

The III Corps of the Grande Armée was a French military unit that existed during the Napoleonic Wars. The corps came to prominence between 1805 and 1809 under the command of Marshal Louis-Nicolas Davout, when it repeatedly scored impressive victories single-handedly or in conjunction with other French forces. Napoleon called it "My tenth legion", in reference to Julius Caesar's finest unit, the X Equestris. Troops from III Corps then took part in many battles in Poland, during the War of the Fourth Coalition, e.g. Czarnowo, Pultusk, Golymin, Eylau.. These troops were later reorganized as the I Corps and included French, German, and Polish units.

== Size ==
By the time of Napoleon's invasion of Russia in 1812, the III Corps had been reorganized and went under the command of Marshal Michel Ney. It consisted of a mixture of Croatian, French, Portuguese, Dutch and Württemberger units and like the rest of Napoleon's forces, suffered heavy casualties as the campaign progressed. At the crossing of the Niemen River in June 1812, the size of the corps was estimated at 44,000 men; by the Battle of Smolensk in August, only 22,000 men remained.

== Battles ==
The corps participated in a number of battles, including Austerlitz, Auerstedt, Eylau, Borodino, Lützen, Bautzen, Katzbach, Leipzig, Ligny, and Waterloo.

== Commanders ==
- Corps commander: Marshal Louis-Nicolas Davout (1805 through 1809);
  - Divisional commanders:
    - General Louis Friant
    - General Charles-Étienne Gudin de La Sablonnière
    - General Charles Antoine Morand
    - General Louis Vincent Le Blond de Saint-Hilaire
  - Corps cavalry under General of Brigade Louis-Pierre Montbrun
- Corps commander: Marshal Michel Ney (1812-1813)
  - Divisional commanders:
    - General Ledru (1812), later General Girard (1813)
    - General Razout (1812), later General Ricard (1813)
    - General Royal Prince of Württemberg, later General of Division Jean Gabriel Marchand
    - General Souham (1813)
    - General Montmorand (1813)
  - Corps cavalry under General-Major Woellwarth (1812), later General of Brigade Laboissière
- Corps commander: General Joseph Souham (1813)
  - Divisional commanders:
    - General Brayer
    - General Delmas
    - General Ricard
  - Corps cavalry under General of Brigade Beurmann
- Corps commander: General Dominique Vandamme (1815)
  - Divisional commanders:
    - General Lefol
    - General Habert
    - General Berthézène
  - Corps cavalry under General Domon
