= Arredondo =

Arredondo is a surname of Spanish origin. Notable people with the surname include:

== Arts and entertainment ==
- Claudio Arredondo (born 1962), Chilean actor
- Héctor Arredondo (1970–2014), Mexican actor
- Inés Arredondo (1928–1989), Mexican writer
- Isidoro Arredondo (1655–1702), Spanish painter
- Maria Arredondo (born 1985), Norwegian pop singer
- Ricardo Arredondo (painter) (1850–1911), Spanish painter
- Samuel Arredondo (born 2002), Korean-Mexican pop singer

== Politics and military ==
- Carolina Arredondo (born 1986), Chilean politician and actress
- Arcelia Arredondo García (born 1957), Mexican politician
- Avelino Arredondo, 19th century Uruguayan assassin
- Ben Arredondo (1947–2026), American politician
- Carlos Arredondo (born 1960), American anti-war activist
- Jesús Arredondo Velázquez (born 1964), Mexican politician
- José Joaquín de Arredondo (1768–1837), Spanish-Mexican soldier
- Nicolás Antonio de Arredondo (1726–1802), Spanish soldier and politician, fourth viceroy of Río de la Plata
- Manuel Arredondo y Pelegrín (1738–1822), Spanish judge, soldier and colonial administrator in Peru and Ecuador
- Salvador Arredondo Ibarra (born 1948), Mexican politician
- Sergio Arredondo (died 2018), Chilean death squad leader
- Victor A. Arredondo, Mexican politician

== Sport ==
- Édgar Arredondo (born 1997), Mexican baseball player
- Eduardo Arredondo (born 1984), Mexican baseball player
- José Arredondo (born 1984), Dominican baseball pitcher
- Rojelio Arredondo (born 1950), American sport shooter
- Julián Arredondo (born 1988), Colombian cyclist
- Luis Arredondo (born 1952), Mexican judoka
- Nicolás Arredondo (boxer) (1950–1987), Mexican boxer
- René Arredondo (judoka) (born 1944), Mexican judoka
- René Arredondo (boxer) (born 1961), Mexican boxer, brother of Ricardo Arredondo (boxer) and Roberto Arredondo
- Ricardo Arredondo (boxer) (1949–1991), Mexican boxer, brother of René Arredondo (boxer) and Roberto Arredondo
- Valentín Arredondo (born 1989), Mexican footballer

== Other ==
- Alberto Arredondo (1912–1968), Cuban journalist and economist
- Oscar Arredondo (1918–2001), Cuban paleontologist and ornithologist
- Patricia Arrendondo (born 1945), Mexican-American counseling psychologist
- Pedro "Pete" Arredondo, chief of the Uvalde Consolidated Independent School District Police Department, 2020–2022
