= Gregorio Bernaldo de Quirós =

Spanish army officer (1771–1808)

Gregorio Bernaldo de Quirós y Navia
- Born: 23 April 1771; Oviedo, Asturias
- Died: 11 November 1808 (aged 37) Espinosa de los Monteros, Burgos
- Conflicts: Peninsular War; Battle of Espinosa

Gregorio Bernaldo de Quirós y Navia (23 April 1771 – 11 November 1808) was a Spanish military commander killed in action at the beginning of the Peninsular War.

== Early career ==
Having enlisted as a cadet in the Royal Guard, he was promoted to Fusilier alférez in 1793, Grenadier alférez in 1794 and Fusilier first lieutenant in 1801.

== Peninsular War ==
Stationed at Oviedo in 1803, he was promoted to field marshal following the outbreak of the Peninsular War in 1808. Leading one of the brigades of the Acevedo's Asturian division, incorporated in the Army of Galicia, under Joaquín Blake, he participated at the Battle of Espinosa, where the whole division was routed following the loss of their commanding officers, when Acevedo and Valdés, the other brigadier, were both seriously wounded and Quirós was killed.
