= Battle of Valmaseda =

1808 Battle of the Peninsular War

- Part of the Peninsular War
Date	5 November 1808
Location	Valmaseda, near Bilbao, Spain 43°11′N 3°11′W
Result	Spanish victory

Belligerents
(First French Empire) French Empire	Spain

Commanders and leaders
(First French Empire) Eugene-Casimir Villatte	(Spain) Joaquín Blake

Strength
13,000	24,000

Casualties and losses
300 killed or wounded 300 captured baggage train captured	50 killed or wounded

Peninsular War
current battle

The Battle of Valmaseda (or Balmaseda) took place on 5 November 1808, during Lieutenant-General Blake's retreat from superior French armies in northern Spain. Reinforced by veteran regular infantry from General La Romana's Division of the North (Spanish: Division del Norte), Blake's force suddenly turned on its pursuers and ambushed Marshal Victor's errant vanguard under Général de division Villatte.

== Background ==
Napoleon's invasion of Spain had started with the Battle of Zornoza, where Marshal François Lefebvre's failed to destroy the Spanish army, as Blake had shaken off the premature French assault and escaped with his army intact. Further mistakes were made in the French pursuit, namely when Victor carelessly allowed his Army Corps to spread out in its search for an enemy he regarded as beaten.

== Forces ==
=== French ===
Major-General Eugene-Casimir Villatte commanded the 3rd Division of Lefebvre's IV Corps. This oversized unit included three battalions each of the 27th Light, 63rd, 94th and 95th Line Infantry Regiments, plus two foot artillery batteries.

=== Spanish ===
Blake's Army of Galicia was made up of five infantry divisions, a vanguard and a reserve:

General Figueroa: commanded the 1st Division [Hibernia, Santiago, Mallorca, Mandoñedo, Rey].

General Martinengo: the 2nd Division [Segovia, Victoria, Voluntarios de Navarra, Pontevedra] (5,100) (seven battalions).

General Riquelme: the 3rd Division [Compostela, Gerona, Sevilla, 6th Marina] (seven battalions).

General Carbajal: the 4th Division [Granaderos] (10 battalions, one present).

General La Romana: the 5th Division [Barcelona, 1st Cataluña, 1st & 2nd Zamora, Princesa] (5,300) (seven battalions).

General Mendizabal: the vanguard [Aragon, 2nd Cataluña, Leon, Navos] (five battalions)

General Mahy: the reserve [Granaderos, Battalion de General, Corona, Galica, Guardas Nacionales de Galica] (five battalions).

General Acevedo: Asturian Division [Conges de Tineo, Salas, Siero, Villivicioa, Lena, Oviedo, Castropol] (ten battalions).

There were 1,000 gunners manning 38 cannon and only 300 cavalry.

== Battle ==
Victor tried to trap General Acevedo's Asturian Division, which had separated from Blake's army. Instead, Blake was able to draw the French into a trap of his own, and on 5 November Villatte's division, operating ahead of the other French formations, blundered into a brusque attack. This attack drove the French out of Valmaseda.

But while their leaders had erred badly, the iron discipline of the French soldiers did not fail them. Villatte, refusing to surrender, formed his troops into squares and managed to claw his way out of the Spanish encirclement. Even so, the Spaniards captured 300 men and one gun.

During the French retreat, Acevedo's errant division bumped into Villatte's baggage train and captured most of it. On 8 November a resurgent Victor recaptured Valmaseda, killing and wounding 150 and capturing 600 men from Blake's rearguard.

Upon learning of the battle, Napoleon, shocked that his Grande Armée should suffer even a minor defeat by "an army of bandits led by monks," severely reprimanded Victor for his imprudence. Victor redeemed himself two weeks later when he finally defeated Blake at the Battle of Espinosa.

== Aftermath ==
Napoleon's invasion of Spain proceeded with the Siege of Roses.

== See also ==
- Timeline of the Peninsular War

== Bibliography ==
- Smith, Digby. The Napoleonic Wars Data Book. London: Greenhill, 1998. ISBN 1-85367-276-9

Preceded by Battle of Zornoza	Napoleonic Wars; Battle of Valmaseda	Succeeded by Battle of Burgos
