= Nicolás Mahy =

Spanish military officer

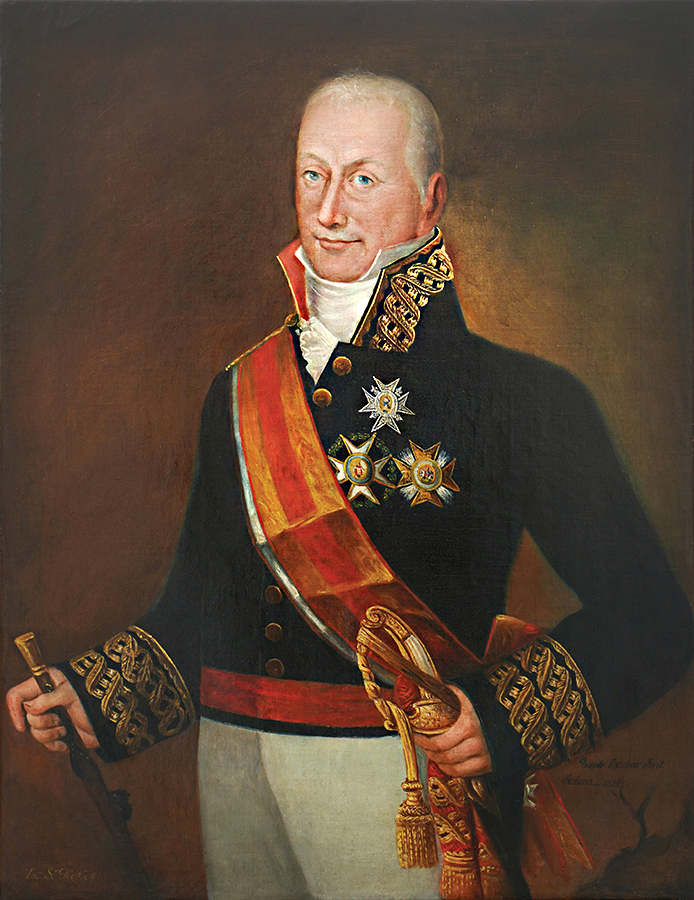
- Born: 10 September 1757; Madrid, Spain
- Died: 22 July 1822 (aged 64) Havana, Cuba
- Conflicts: War of the Pyrenees; Peninsular War; Battle of Zornoza; Battle of Espinosa de los Monteros

Nicolás Mahy Martín (1757–1822) was a Spanish military commander.

== Early career ==
Mahy enlisted in the Compañía Flamenca de Reales Guardias de Corps in 1770, unit he would stay with for over thirty years, reaching the rank of brigadier. In 1794 he saw action in the War of the Pyrenees. He was promoted to Cavalry brigadier in 1798 and in 1803 he was appointed military and political commanding officer for the province of Tuy, in Galicia.

== Peninsular War ==
He was promoted to field marshal a month after the outbreak of the war and in September 1808 was given command of the Reserve Division of General Blake's Army of Galicia, or Army of the Left.

His division saw action at Zornoza (31 October) and the following month at Espinosa de los Monteros (Burgos) and in the retreat from Leon to Galicia, where the command of the Army of Galicia was handed over to General La Romana.

At Monterrey (March 1809), with Soult's three infantry divisions and a dragoon division approaching, La Romana spiked the guns of the fortress and abandoned it, retreating towards Puebla de Sanabria. Franceschi's horsemen, following close behind, caught up with and attacked La Romana's rearguard, some 1,200 bayonets, under Mahy, at Osoño, just outside Monterrey, killing 300 men and taking 400 prisoners, as well as capturing three standards.

In April 1809, La Romana gave him temporary command of the Army of Galicia while he himself hastened to Oviedo with one of his old corps from the Division of the North, the La Princesa Regiment, and where he staged a minor coup d’état against the Junta. While La Romana was away, Mahy expelled the French forces from Galicia with actions at Lugo, Santiago, and at Puente Sanpayo, for which he was promoted to lieutenant general. The following month, he was appointed interim commanding officer of the Army of Asturias and was able to not only push the French forces out of the mountains of Cantabria, but also to stop them re-entering Asturias.

At the beginning of 1810 Mahy had to hand over his command due to ill health and retire to La Coruña. The following May he was appointed commanding officer of the Army of Asturias and the coasts of Cantabria. In July he was also appointed governor and captain general of the Army of Galica and the Kingdom of Galicia.

In January 1811 Mahy was appointed commanding officer of the 3rd Army, stationed in Murcia. On reaching Alicante, he had to withdraw his troops from the city due to an outbreak of bubonic plague.

He was promoted to lieutenant general in 1813.

== Post-war career ==
With the Trienio Liberal and the restoration of the Constitution in 1820, Mahy was appointed captain general of Old Castile and of Cuba in 1821, post he held at the time of his death.
