= Eugène-Casimir Villatte =

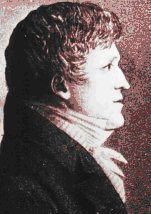
- Eugène-Casimir Villatte
- Born: 14 April 1770; Longwy, France
- Died: 14 May 1834 (aged 64) Nancy, Meurthe-et-Moselle, France
- Allegiance: France
- Branch: Infantry
- Service years: 1792–1834
- Rank: General of Division
- Conflicts: French Revolutionary Wars; Napoleonic Wars
- Awards: Légion d'Honneur
- Other work: Count of the Empire

Eugène-Casimir Villatte, comte d'Oultremont (French pronunciation: [øʒɛn kazimiʁ vilat kɔ̃t dultʁəmɔ̃]; 14 April 1770 – 14 May 1834) fought in the French army during the Wars of the French Revolution and the Napoleonic Wars. He rose to command a division at many of the important battles in the Peninsular War. His is one of the names inscribed under the Arc de Triomphe.

== Early career ==
Born in Longwy as part of the House of d'Oultremont, Villatte joined the army and was a sous-lieutenant (second lieutenant) at the beginning of the French Revolution. After joining the military in January 1792, his first assignment was as lieutenant of the 13th infantry. In 1795 he served as an aide to Jean-Baptiste Bernadotte and later as an adjutant-commandant. He rose to the rank of general of brigade in 1803.

== Empire ==
During the Ulm Campaign in 1805, he commanded a brigade under Marshal Michel Ney at the Battle of Elchingen. Still under Ney, he fought at the Battle of Jena and the capture of Magdeburg in 1806. After leading his brigade at the combat of Waltersdorf and the Battle of Eylau in February 1807, Villatte was promoted to general of division. He led his troops in a successful defense of the bridge over the Pasłęka (Passarge) River at Spędy (Spanden) on 5 June 1807. In this action, part of the Battle of Guttstadt-Deppen, Villatte defeated Michael Szabszinski von Rembow's Prussian-Russian division belonging to Anton Wilhelm von L'Estocq corps.

On 5 November 1808, while commanding the 12,000-man 3rd Division of the IV Corps, Villatte was attacked by Joaquin Blake's 24,000-strong Army of Galicia. In the Battle of Valmaseda, he was defeated and lost his baggage, but managed to extricate his soldiers with the loss of only 500 men and one cannon. After his division transferred into Marshal Claude Victor's I Corps, Villatte fought at the Battle of Espinosa. Still under Victor, he led his division at the battles of Uclés, Medellin and Talavera in 1809.

In 1813, Villatte led a division in the Army of the South at the Battle of Vitoria. In Marshal Nicolas Soult's reorganized army, he commanded the Reserve Division for the rest of the war. His division was present and/or engaged at the battles of the Pyrenees, the Bidassoa, the Nivelle, the Nive, Orthez and Toulouse.

During the Hundred Days, Villatte remained loyal to the Bourbons. After the Restoration, he served as Inspector General of Infantry and as commander of various military divisions. He died at Nancy in 1834. VILLATTE is etched on Column 2 of the Arc de Triomphe.
