= Vicente María de Acevedo =

Spanish army officer (1760–1808)

- Born: 1760; Vigo, Pontevedra
- Died: 12 November 1808 (aged 47–48) Las Quintanillas, Cantabria
- Rank: Captain general
- Conflicts: Peninsular War; Battle of Espinosa de los Monteros

Vicente María Acevedo Pola (1760–1808) was a Spanish army officer killed in the early days of the Peninsular War.

Although Acevedo had retired in 1803 as a captain in the Spanish Royal Guards (equivalent to colonel in other regiments of Spain's army), following the popular uprising in Asturias, he offered his services to the Junta Superior of Asturias as a military advisor, and on 12 June 1808, he was promoted to lieutenant general, serving under the orders of Joaquín Navia Osorio, marqués de Santa Cruz de Marcenado. When, some days later, the latter resigned due to disagreement with the Junta, Acevedo was promoted to captain general of Asturias and he immediately set about raising new regiments of volunteers. However, by mid-August, there were only eight thousand men available to fight, less than half the number initially planned for.

== Asturian Division ==
In September, Acevedo proposed bringing together the various Asturian units into one division which, following the war council held in Madrid after the Battle of Bailén, would then be included in Blake's Army of the Left. Acevedo's proposal was that the Asturian division be composed of two brigades of some five thousand troops each, commanded by Cayetano Valdés y Flores and Gregorio Bernaldo de Quirós, as well as a reserve, made up of two thousand troops, commanded by Nicolás Llano Ponte.

The Asturian Division, composed of nineteen new battalions, with Acevedo himself in command, set up its headquarters at Quinconces (Burgos) on 11 October. Eight battalions then headed off to join Blake's Army of the Left at Villaro (Vizcaya), the others remaining in Asturias to protect the Principality.

Although the division saw some action in minor skirmishes around Bilbao, it first entered into action, with 7,633 troops, as part of the Army of the Left on 3 and 5 November, at Valmaseda, when they repelled the forces led by General Villatte.

On 5 November, as Acevedo's troops were marching join Blake's Army, they came across Villatte's division as it was retreating on the other side of a stream, from Blake's troops. Acevedo sent a battalion of Segovia and two battalions of volunteers of Galicia across the stream to intercept the retiring column. Although Villatte managed to escape, he was forced to abandon an eight-pounder gun, many baggage-wagons, and 300 prisoners.

Three days later, however, Acevedo's rearguard was attacked by General Lefèbvre's IV Corps and some three thousand men were forced to retreat towards the Cantabrian coast, thus separating themselves from their division.

== Battle of Espinosa de los Monteros ==
On 10 and 11 November, an exhausted Army of the Left, including what remained of the Asturian Division attempted to halt the French offensive at Espinosa de los Monteros. The battle commenced late in the day with an attack by Marshal Victor, which was repelled. The following day, the French forces attacked again and Acevedo launched a counterattack, sending his troops downhill into a barrage of musket-fire from Maison's brigade of fusiliers, resulting in the Spanish commanding officers, at the head of their raw recruits, bearing the brunt of the fire; General Quirós was killed and both Valdés and Acevedo were seriously wounded, the latter blinded. The defeated Army of the Left suffered over five thousand casualties.

== Death ==
Acevedo, incapacitated as commander-in-chief of his division, handed over the command to General Llano Ponte, and was evacuated. On 12 November, with a small escort, led by Rafael del Riego, then a captain. Acevedo was stopped by a cavalry patrol of the Trascher Provisional Regiment and hacked to death. Riego was unharmed, but taken prisoner.
