= Battle of Zornoza =

1808 Battle of the Peninsular War

- Part of the Peninsular War
- Movements of the French troops in Spain during the first stages of the Peninsular War (in Spanish)
Date	31 October 1808
Location	Zornoza, Spain 43°13′10″N 2°43′3″W
Result	French victory

Belligerents
(France) French Empire	Spain

Commanders and leaders
(First French Empire) François Joseph Lefebvre	(Spain) Joaquín Blake

Strength
21,000	19,000

Casualties and losses
200–300	600–1,000

Peninsular War: Napoleon's invasion
current battle

The Battle of Zornoza, fought on 31 October 1808, was one of the opening engagements in Napoleon's invasion of Spain. The battle was intended to encircle and crush the left wing of the Spanish front. The Spanish infantry was swiftly thrown back but escaped in good order.

== Background ==
The Dos de Mayo Uprising had put Iberia in revolt against French rule. The Spanish conventional warfare had started at El Bruch (June 1808), while the Battle of Bailen (July 1808) marked the first open-field defeat of a Napoleonic army. British intervention had started at Roliça (August 1808), and Napoleon's personal participation in the invasion of Spain started with the engagement of Joaquín Blake's forces at Zornoza.

Under Napoleon's guidance, the French had made meticulous preparations to defeat Blake's position and thereby beat the left wing of the Spanish front that stretched from Cantabria to the Mediterranean Sea. Owing to friction with the Spanish authorities and a lack of coordination by the Central Junta, Blake, for his part, had no confidence in the Spanish deployment and could do little but conduct a cautious advance in the direction of Bilbao.

== Forces ==
Lefebvre's IV Corps included three infantry divisions and 36 cannon. Major-General Horace Sébastiani's 1st Division contained the 28th Light and 75th Line (three battalions) and the 32nd and 58th Line (two battalions). Major-general Leval's 2nd Division was made up of the Dutch brigade and two battalions each of the 2nd Nassau, 4th Baden and Hesse-Darmstadt Gross-und-Erbprinz Regiments, and the Paris National Guard and Frankfurt battalions. Major-general Eugene-Casimir Villatte's 3rd Division included three battalions each of the 27th Light, 63rd, 94th and 95th Line.

Blake's Army of Galicia contained three infantry divisions, a vanguard and a reserve. General Figueroa commanded the 1st Division (4,000); General Riquelme, the 3rd Division (4,800); General Carbajal, the 4th Division (3,500); General Mendizabal, the Vanguard (2,900); and General Mahy. the Reserve (3,000). Only six of Blake's guns came into action.

== Battle ==
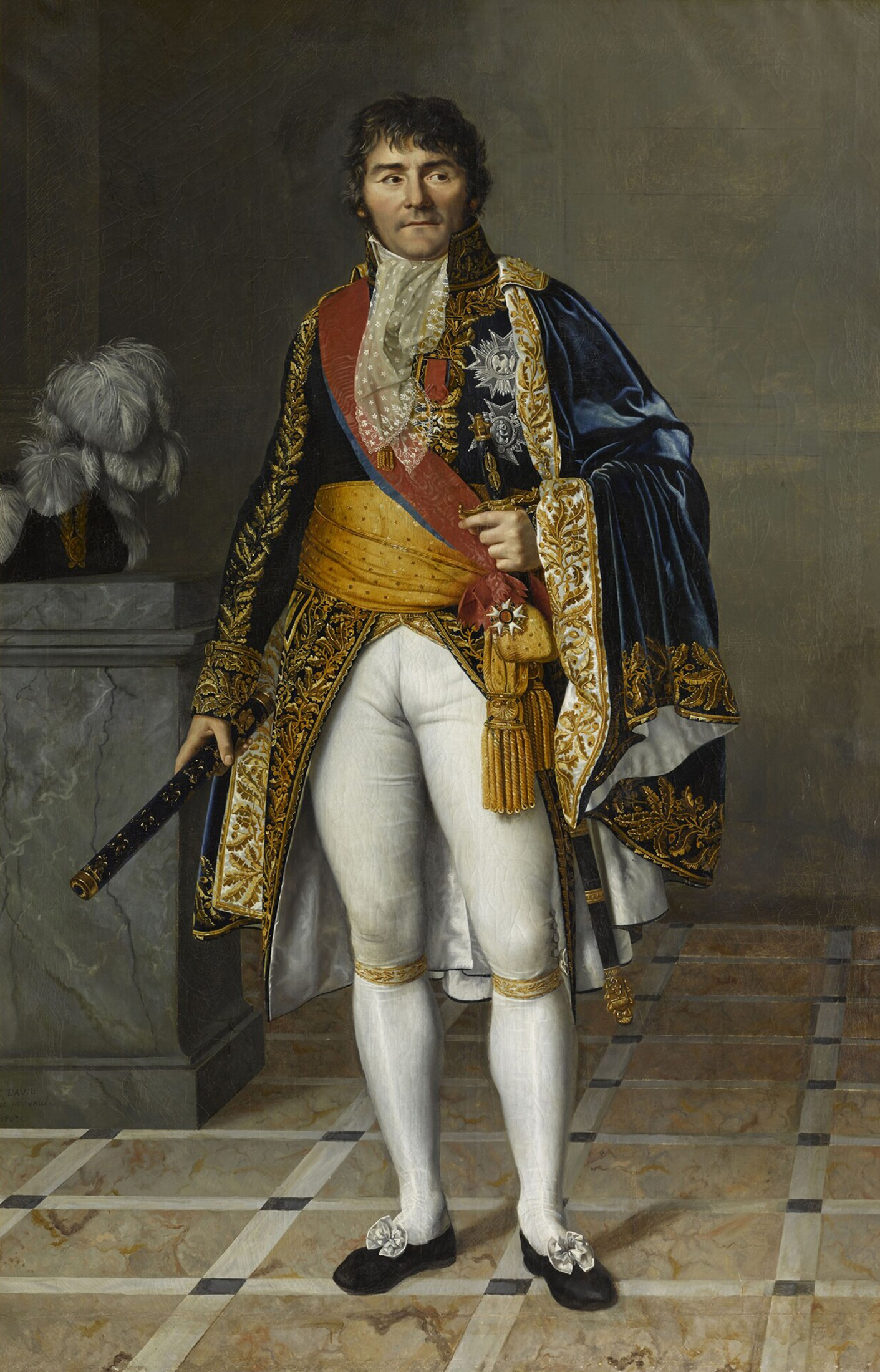
François-Joseph Lefebvre, Duc de Dantzig, Maréchal de France

On October 31, 1808, Marshal François Lefebvre bloodied the Army of Galicia under Lieutenant General Joaquín Blake but failed to encircle or destroy it, upsetting both the Emperor and the French strategic situation. Lefebvre had disobeyed Napoleon's orders and launched his IV Corps into a premature attack against Blake. Blake was deeply disturbed by the appearance of French forces and took immediate measures to withdraw his troops and guns. The Spanish infantry, fighting without artillery support, was swiftly thrown back but escaped in good order.

== Casualties ==
Lefebvre lost 200 casualties and Blake 600. Although the French had managed something of a tactical victory, the battle was a definite strategic blunder: Blake escaped the French trap and conducted a crafty withdrawal, checked his pursuers at Valmaseda, and was not caught until November 10. Ultimately, however, the overwhelming strength of Napoleon's Grande Armée allowed the French to sweep past the tottering Spanish defences and capture Madrid by year's end.

== Aftermath ==
Napoleon's invasion of Spain proceeded with the Battle of Valmaseda.

== See also ==
- Timeline of the Peninsular War

== Notes ==
Preceded by Battle of Vimeiro	Napoleonic Wars; Battle of Zornoza	Succeeded by Battle of Valmaseda
