= Juan O'Neille =

Spanish Army officer (1765–1809)

Juan O'Neille y Varela (c. 1765 – 24 February 1809), also known as Juan O'Neylle, was a Spanish Army officer who served at the beginning of the Peninsular War, rising to the rank of lieutenant general and command of the 1st Division of the Army of Aragon in 1808.

== Family ==
He was the youngest son of Felix O'Neill, who was born in Creggan, County Armagh, possibly on 1 November 1720 (according to his commission papers, although later Spanish records give birth dates of 1712, 1717, and 1718), and Jacoba Varela Sarmiento. They had three sons, Terencio (b. 1759), Felix (b. 1760/61) and Juan (b. c.1765), all of whom would go on to have distinguished careers in the Spanish army and navy. Felix O'Neill had enlisted in Spain's Regiment of Hibernia, an infantry regiment of exiled Irish Jacobites, as a cadet in 1730, and would go on to become its colonel in 1763. In 1792 he was appointed inspector-general of the infantry, commandant-general of Galicia, captain-general of the royal army of Aragon and president of the king's royal audience. Juan O'Neille was probably born at Pamplona, since his father was the colonel of the Regiment of Hibernia garrisoned there at that time.

== Military career ==
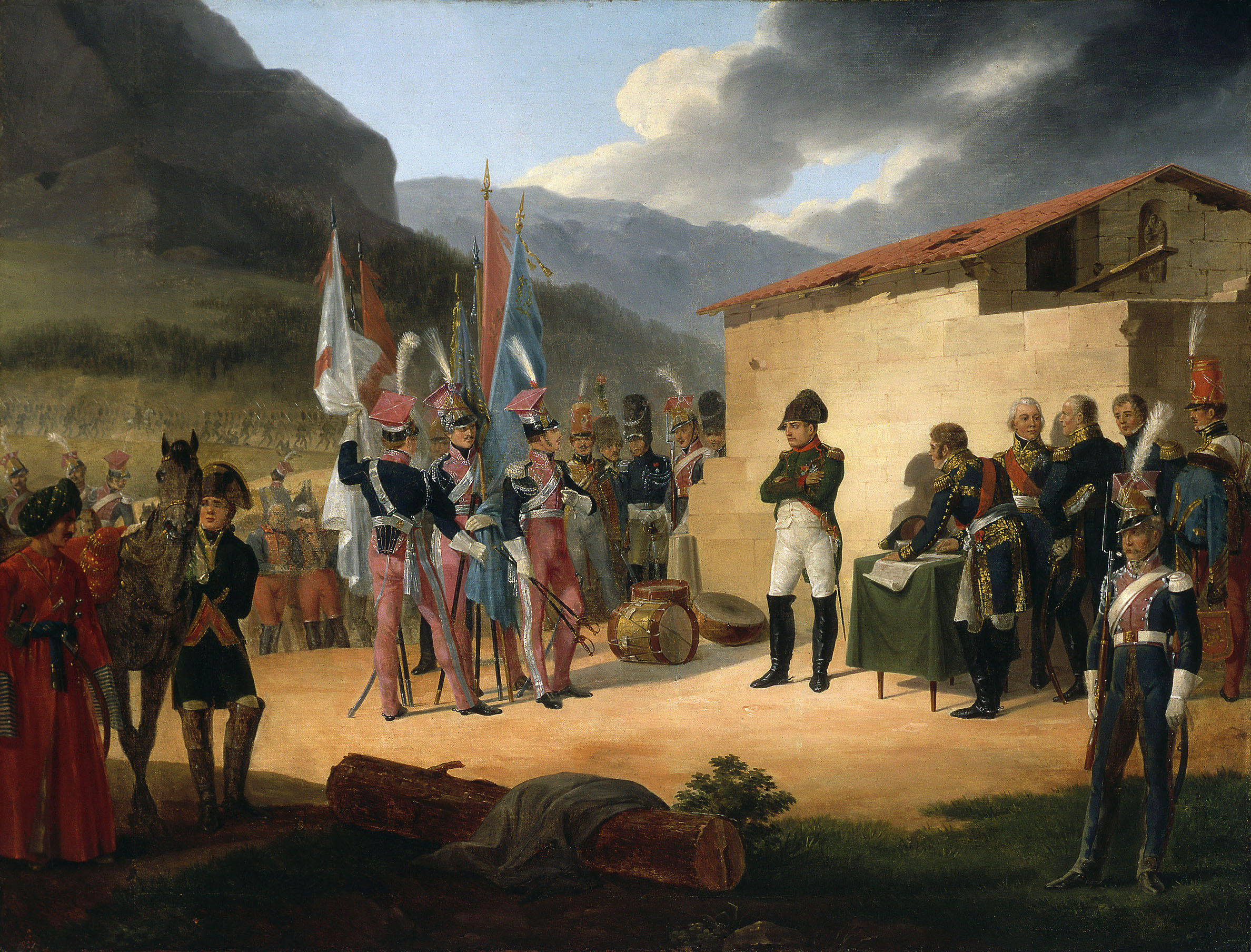
Battle of Tudela (Napoleon receiving the captured banners from Wincenty Krasiński) by January Suchodolski, 1827, National Museum in Warsaw

After having been a page to King Charles III, O'Neille was appointed captain of the Ultonia Infantry Regiment in 1783, and promoted to lieutenant colonel in 1789.

Appointed commander of the 3rd Battalion of the Infantry Regiment of Aragon, O'Neille distinguished himself at the Siege of Ceuta (1790–1791) in October 1791. The following year he was appointed battalion commander of the 3rd Infantry Regiment of the Princess (3º Regimiento de Infantería de la Princesa).

At the start of the War of the Pyrenees, O'Neille was promoted to lieutenant colonel of his regiment in the Army of Navarre and Guipúzcoa, and distinguished himself at Zabaldica on 15 November 1794. He was promoted to colonel at the beginning of 1795 and later that year, to Infantry brigadier. The following year he was promoted to colonel of the Infantry Regiment of Navarre.

Promoted to field marshal in 1802, he was appointed military governor of Jaca the following year, and commander-in-chief of Mallorca in 1806.

=== Peninsular War ===
At the start of the Peninsular War, O'Neille went to Aragon, where José Rebolledo de Palafox promoted him to lieutenant general and gave him command of the 1st Division of the Army of Aragon.

At Zaragoza, O'Neille saw action in the successful Spanish defense during the first siege of the city. O'Neille marched with his troops from Valencia to Aragon where he was instrumental in lifting the French siege of Zaragoza by driving away the forces of François Joseph Lefebvre who was forced to retire to Navarre. Palafox entrusted O'Neille, together with the Marquis de Lazán, to press the retreat of Lefebvre. This bold attack forced the occupying French forces to abandon Tudela and O'Neylle was personally responsible for destroying a French column in the area around Nardués.

On November 23, 1808, the Spanish army of Andalucía regrouped and prepared to give battle under the command of Francisco Javier Castaños, 1st Duke of Bailén with Palafox as the second in command. This engagement was to become known as the disastrous Battle of Tudela. The French forces, under the command of Jean Lannes routed the Spanish army which was forced to retreat to Zaragoza.

On December 21, 1808, O'Neille saw action in the Battle of Arrabal outside Zaragoza, where Spanish forces from Murcia and Valencia successfully repelled repeated attacks from the division under the command of Honoré Théodore Maxime Gazan de la Peyrière, forcing them to retire. He was further involved in pursuing the retreating French forces later that month. The French had built a pontoon bridge from La Almozara to the opposite bank of the Ebro in order to facilitate communication between Gazan's camp and that of the remaining French forces. O'Neille, at the head of 4,000 men, attacked the entrenched French position, successfully driving them off, but was unable to hold the pontoon bridge, thereby rendering the whole operation fruitless.

== Death ==
In late January 1809, O'Neille became gravely ill during the outbreak of typhoid fever in Zaragoza, but was apparently able to recover. According to the biography written by Brigadier Gen. M. Sala-Valdés, the subsequent news of the Spanish capitulation to French forces that year caused him to die from a "broken heart", although some sources maintain that he died from typhoid fever.

Juan O'Neille died on 24 February 1809. He was buried in the Basilica of Our Lady of the Pillar.

== Bibliography ==
- Sala Valdes y Garcia Sala, Mario (1908). Obelisco Histórico en Honor de los Heróicos Defensores de Zaragoza en sus Dos Sitios (1808-1809) (PDF) (in Spanish). Zaragoza: Impresor del Excsmo. Sr. Arzobispo.
