= Battle of Tudela =

1808 battle of the Peninsular War

- Part of the Peninsular War
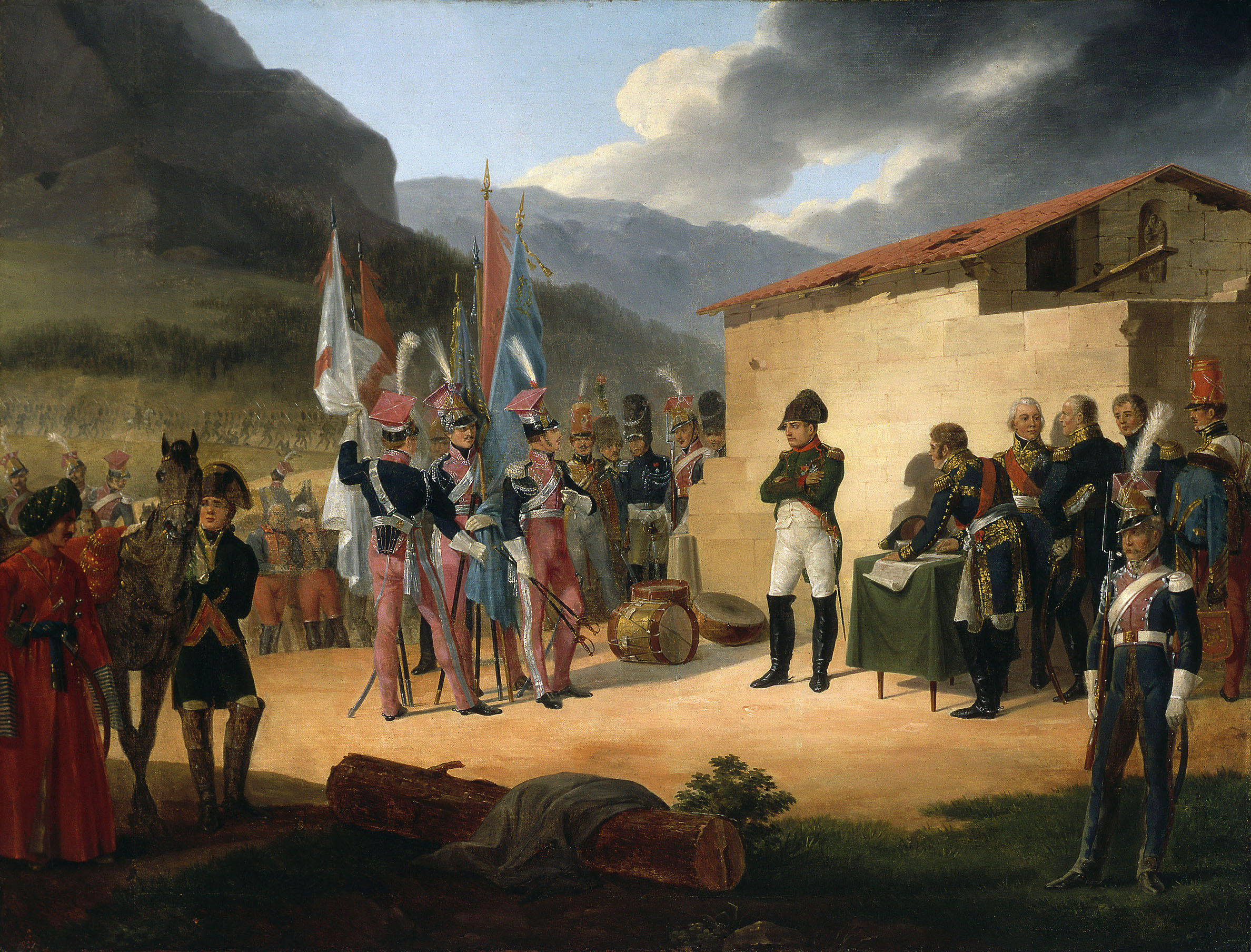
- The Battle of Tudela; January Suchodolski, 1827
Date	23 November 1808
Location	Tudela, Navarre, Spain 42°03′17.73″N 1°36′58.79″W
Result	French victory

Belligerents
France; Duchy of Warsaw	Spain

Commanders and leaders
(First French Empire) Jean Lannes (First French Empire) Michel Ney (First French Empire) Lefebvre-Desnouettes	(Spain) Duke of Bailén (Spain) Duke of Saragossa (Spain) Juan O'Neylle

Strength
35,000	45,000

Casualties and losses
700	6,000

Peninsular War: Spain
current battle
Wellington in command
Wellington not in command

The Battle of Tudela (23 November 1808) saw an Imperial French army led by Marshal Jean Lannes attack a Spanish army under General Castaños. The battle resulted in the complete victory of the Imperial forces over their adversaries. The combat occurred near Tudela in Navarre, Spain during the Peninsular War, part of a wider conflict known as the Napoleonic Wars.

== Background ==
Napoleon's invasion of Spain had started with the Battle of Zornoza. Napoleon's strategy was to make a strong attack towards Burgos splitting off the army of Blake from the others and to outflank them by then swinging both north and south.

== Preliminaries ==
On 21 November 1808 Castaños was around Calahorra on the Ebro between Logroño and Tudela. On this day the French III Corps crossed the Ebro at Logroño and headed east towards Calahorra while at the same time Marshal Michel Ney with the VI Corps reached the Upper Douro Valley and headed towards Tudela.

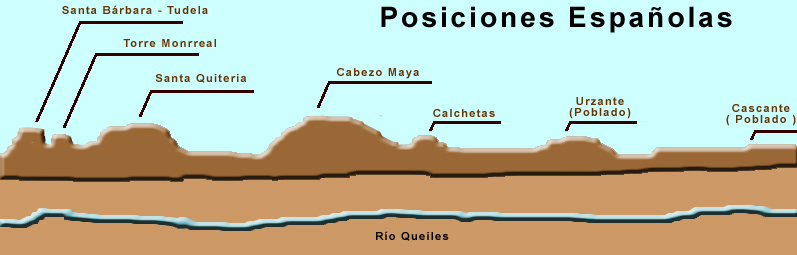
Diagram of Spanish positions: Santa Barbara - La Peña Division

These movements threatened Castaños with entrapment between these two armies. To avoid this Castaños withdrew to Tudela. He decided to defend a line 17 kilometres (11 mi) long stretching west from Tudela along the Ebro, then along the Queiles River to Cascante and finally to Tarazona at the foot of the Moncayo Massif.

Castaños had insufficient men to hold a line of this length so he asked General Juan O'Neylle, who had two divisions at Caparroso on the east bank of the Ebro, for help. As O'Neylle was under the command of Palafox he refused to move without an order from Palafox. This did not arrive until noon on 22 November 1808. O'Neylle moved promptly to the east bank of the Ebro opposite Tudela but decided not to cross the river until the next day.

By nightfall on 22 November 1808 Castaños had almost 45,000 soldiers in the vicinity of Tudela but very few of them actually in position. Castaños placed General Manuel la Peña's 4th Division of 8,000 men, mostly Andalusians who had participated in the Battle of Bailén, at Cascante and General Grimarest at the head of three divisions totaling 13,000 to 14,000 soldiers at Tarazona. General Roca's division was on the east bank of the Ebro plus the two divisions from Aragon of O’Neylle and Felipe Augusto de Saint-Marcq.

Most of the fighting in the battle of Tudela would involve only the three divisions of Roca, O'Neylle, and Saint-Marcq – totaling about 23,000 infantry.

For the French only the III Corps was involved in the Battle of Tudela. Prior to 22 November 1808 this force had been commanded by Marshal Moncey. However, Napoleon transferred command to Marshal Jean Lannes when the advance began. This corps was just under 34,000 men consisting of four infantry divisions and three cavalry regiments. To this was added General of Division Joseph Lagrange's infantry division and General of Brigade Auguste François-Marie de Colbert-Chabanais's cavalry brigade from Ney's corps.

On the night of 22 November the French Army camped at Alfaro – 17 kilometres up the Ebro from Tudela.

== Battle ==
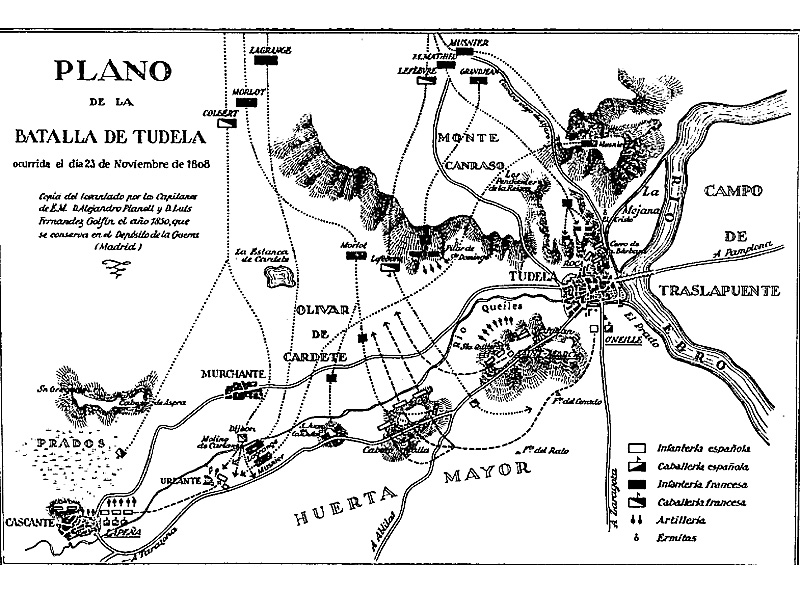
Plan of the battle

On the morning of 23 November 1808 Lagrange's infantry and two cavalry brigades were sent towards Cascante. The rest of the force was sent along the Ebro towards Tudela.

At this time O'Neylle was trying to get his three divisions across the Ebro. Roca's was across first and reached its position on the right of the Spanish line just as the French attacked.

Saint-Marcq's division was second across and also took up position before the attack.

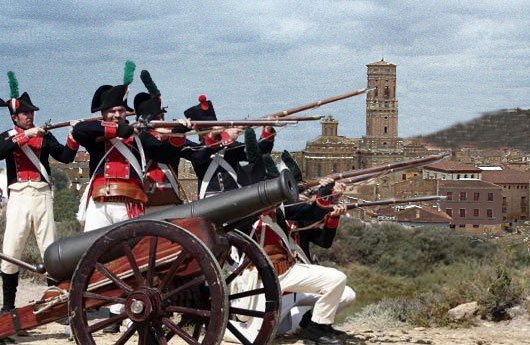
Recreation of the battle on the hill of Santa Barbara with the tower of the cathedral in the background

By the time O'Neylle's own division was crossing it had to fight French skirmishers who were at the top of the Cabezo Malla ridge.

The initial French attack was carried out in a piecemeal fashion by the vanguard when it was realised that the Spanish were not in position. Although this attack was repelled it showed the weakness of the Spanish positions, especially the 5 kilometres (3 mi) gap between Castaños and La Peña's force at Cascante.

The battle would ultimately be decided by La Peña and Grimarest. By noon on 23 November 1808 they had received orders to move: La Peña to close the gap at Tudela and Grimarest to Cascante. Both men failed to carry out these orders other than La Peña moving two battalions and a detachment of provincial Grenadiers to Urzante. La Peña's lack of initiative allowed the two French cavalry brigades of Colbert and General of Brigade Alexandre, vicomte Digeon to pin him in place.

The second French attack was made with much greater force. On the French left General of Division Antoine Morlot's division attacked Roca's division on the heights above Tudela. On the French right General of Division Maurice Mathieu's division made a frontal assault on the smaller O'Neylle division while also making outflanking moves. The attacks on both left and right were successful with both Spanish divisions being pushed off the ridges they occupied.

Then the French cavalry under General of Division Charles Lefebvre-Desnouettes charged the gap between Roca and Saint-Marcq causing the collapse of the Spanish right.

La Peña and Grimarest finally united at Cascante late in the day giving them a total of 21,000 men against Lagrange's division which was 6,000 strong plus Colbert and Digeon. After the defeat of the rest of the Spanish army however La Peña and Grimarest withdrew after dark. Their poor performance was also reflected in the casualties of only 200 on the Spanish left compared to 3,000 on the right plus 1,000 prisoners.

== Casualties ==
Spanish casualties were estimated to be about 6,000 out of a total force of 45,000. The French, in all, lost no more than 700 dead and wounded out of a total of 35,000.

== Aftermath ==
The Spanish armies of the left and right escaped from Tudela in two directions. The Aragonese forces on the right made for Zaragoza where they would assist in the Second Siege of Zaragoza starting on 20 December 1808. The virtually intact Spanish left moved towards Madrid to defend that city.

Napoleon however moved more quickly, and after defeating a small Spanish army at the Battle of Somosierra on 30 November, his vanguard arrived in Madrid on 1 December 1808, with the city capitulating on 4 December 1808.

Napoleon's strategy ultimately ended successfully with the occupation of Madrid.

== In popular culture ==
The battle was engraved on the Arc de Triomphe in Paris.

== See also ==
- Timeline of the Peninsular War

== Bibliography ==
- Bodart, Gaston (1908). Militär-historisches Kriegs-Lexikon (1618–1905).
- Esdaile, Charles J. (2003). The Peninsular War. Palgrave MacMillan. ISBN 978-1-4039-6231-7.
- Peñas (2020). "EL REGIMIENTO DE VOLUNTARIOS DE SEGORBE 1808–1809". Archived from the original on 17 July 2020.
- Rickard, J. (2008). "Battle of Tudela, 23 November 1808". Archived from the original on 25 January 2021.
- Triomphe (2020). "Battle of Tudela". Archived from the original on 30 January 2020.

Preceded by Battle of Espinosa de los Monteros	Napoleonic Wars; Battle of Tudela	Succeeded by Battle of Somosierra
