= Espinosa de los Monteros =

- Municipality and town
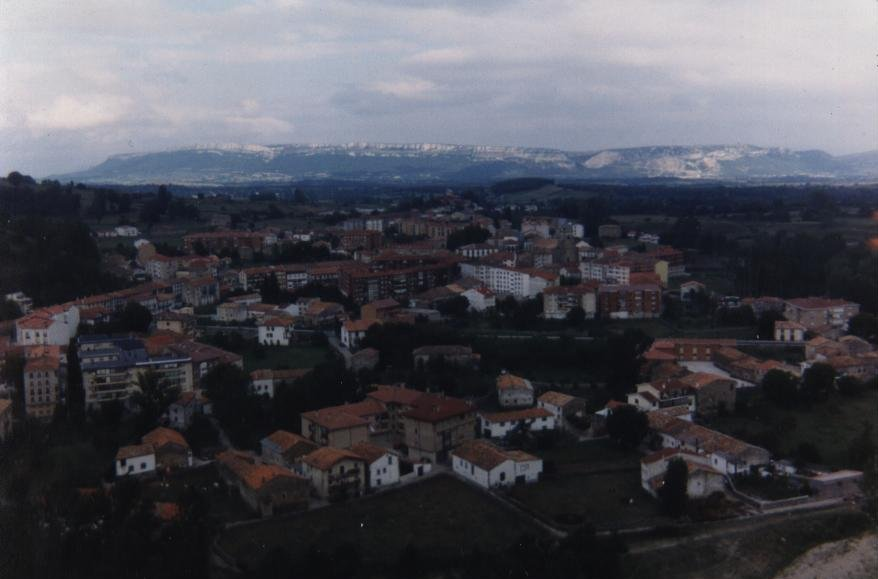
- Espinosa de los Monteros panoramic view, 1996

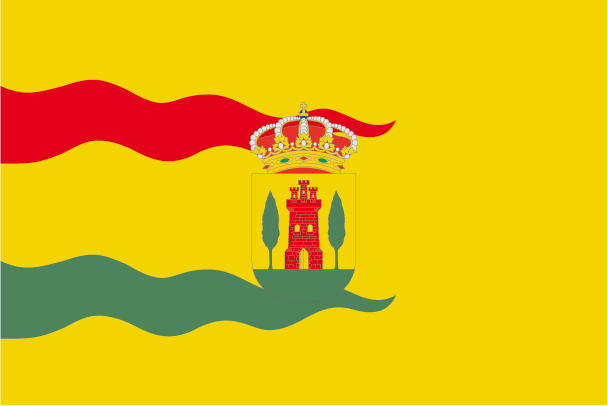
- Flag Coat of arms

- Location of Espinosa de los Monteros municipality in Burgos province

- Location in Spain
- Coordinates: 43°4′N 3°32′W
- Country: Spain
- Autonomous community: Castile and León
- Province: Burgos
- Comarca: Las Merindades

Government
  - Mayor: José Carlos Peña Martínez

Area
  - Total: 137.50 km^{2} (53.09 sq mi)
- Elevation: 762 m (2,500 ft)

Population (2025-01-01)
  - Total: 1,627
  - Density: 11.83/km^{2} (30.65/sq mi)
- Time zone: UTC+1 (CET)
  - Summer (DST): UTC+2 (CEST)
- Postal code: 09560
- Demonym: Espinosiego/a
- Website: Official website

Espinosa de los Monteros is a municipality located in the province of Burgos, Castile and León, Spain, with a population of c. 2,100 inhabitants.

The village is spread over a large rural area at the southern outskirts of a mountainous area of the Cantabrian Mountains.

== History ==
First settlements in the area date from the Bronze and Iron Age, but its modern settling and location officially started with the town charter given by Alfonso VI of León to repopulate it after its war destruction during the early 11th century.

It is home to the ancient Royal Guard of the "Gentlemen of the Chamber" since its founding in 1008 by Sancho García of Castile of the early local counts dynasty.

Espinosa is said to be the birthplace of Miguel de Espinoza's family name and origins, father of the philosopher Baruch Spinoza.

During Napoleonic Wars, The Battle of Espinosa de los Monteros, fought on 10 and 11 November 1808, resulted in a French victory under General Victor against Lieutenant General Joaquín Blake's Army of Galicia.

== Main sights ==
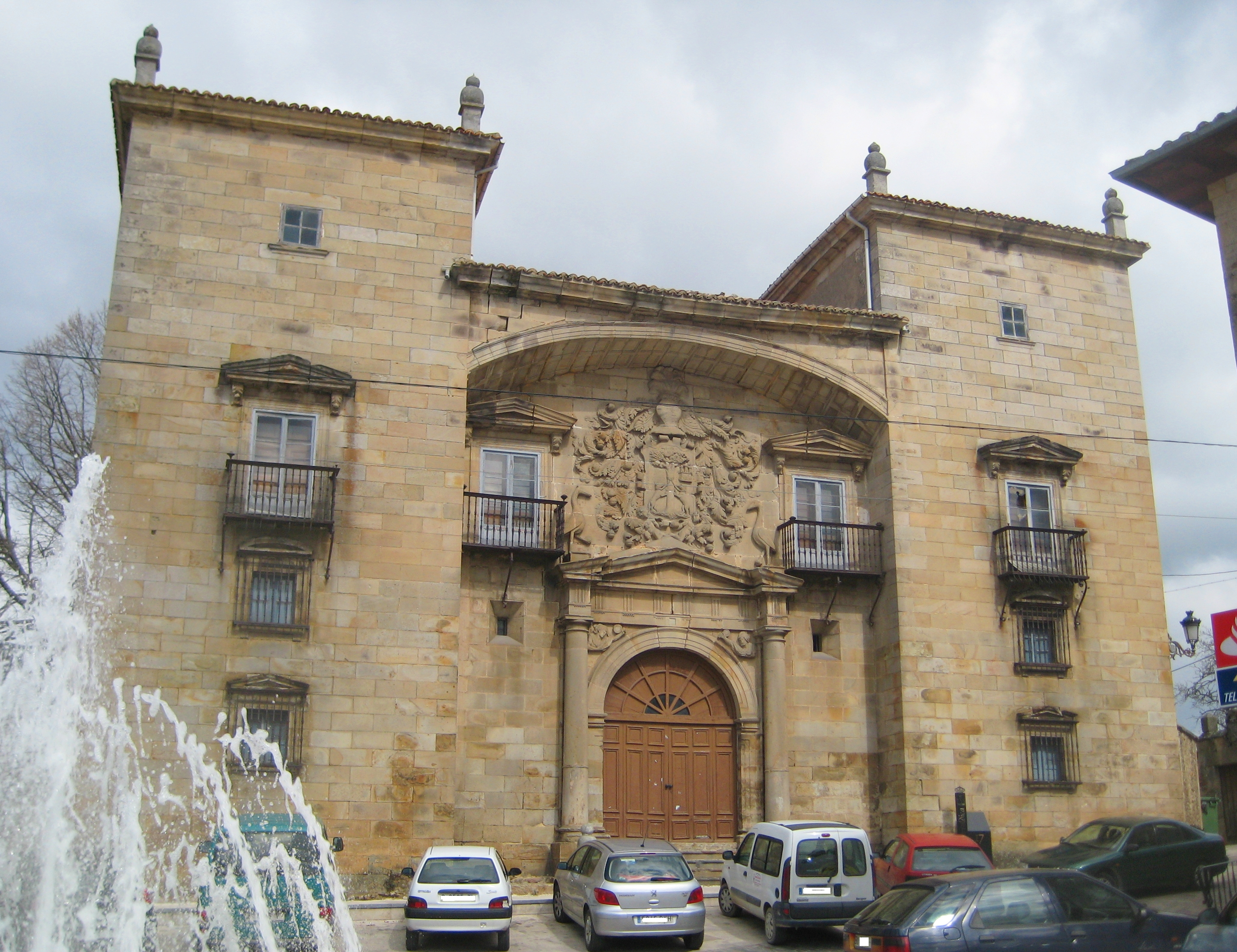
Chiloeches Palace (17th century)

- Palacio de Chiloeches, in Renaissance style, built from 1600. It is characterized by a façade with two towers surmounted by small spires.
- Church of St. Eulalia
- Church of St. Cecilia
- Torre de los Velascos
- Torre Berrueza
- Torre de los Monters (14th century)
- Fernández-Villa palace, in Renaissance style
- Torre de los Azulejos (16th century)

== Economy ==
The main activities and industries have been related to military career services, stockbreeding mostly of cattle and as a regional hub of transportation due its geography, currently are intensified around dairy products and as modern commercial and services local center of its area and smaller neighbor communities of the wider valley. It is developing a small recreation tourism focused in its rugged and preserved mountain attractions. In winter, due to its heavy snowfalls, it runs a modest ski resort mostly catering to the neighbor coastal major cities day and weekend tourism.

== Picón Blanco ==
Picón Blanco is a high mountain peak located in the municipality at an elevation of 1512 m. The road from Arredondo to the abandoned military base at the top is a climb in professional road bicycle racing, having been often used in Vuelta a Burgos and twice at Vuelta a España . It is 7.9 kilometres long at an average gradient of 9.1% (height gain: 721 m).

=== Winners of the climb ===
Year	Stage winner	Race leader
2021	(Estonia) Rein Taaramäe	(Estonia) Rein Taaramäe
2024	(Republic of Ireland) Edward Dunbar	(Slovenia) Primož Roglič

== People from Espinosa de los Monteros ==
- Juan de Salazar de Espinosa (1508–1560) - explorer, founder of the Paraguayan capital city of Asunción.
- Efrén Llarena (born 1995) - rally driver
