= Division of the North =

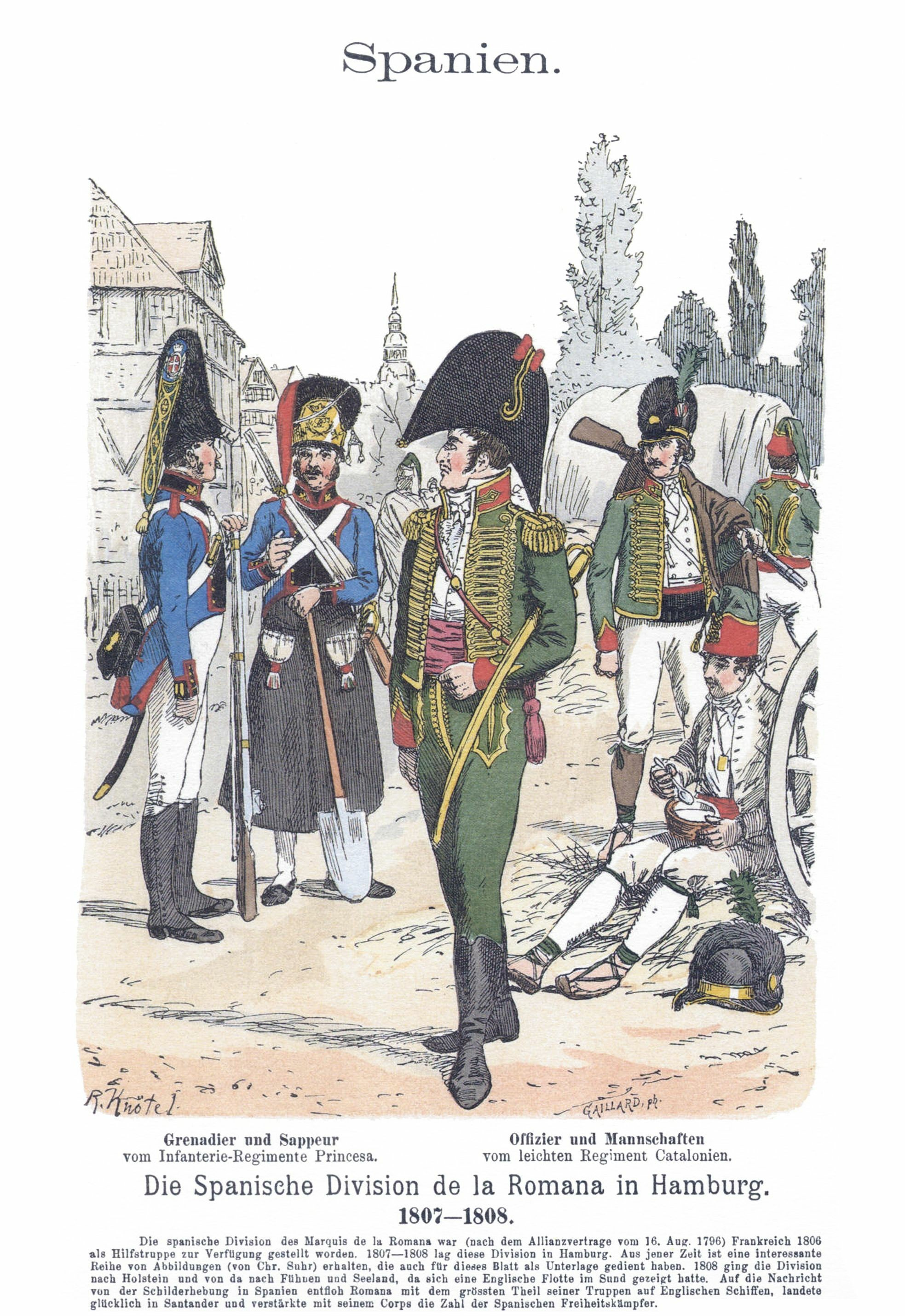
- Active: March – November 1808
- Disbanded: November 1808 (destroyed)
- Country: Spain
- Allegiance: Ferdinand VII of Spain
- Branch: Army
- Type: Infantry
- Role: Garrison, front-line
- Size: 15,000
- Garrison/HQ: Denmark (until May 1808)
- Engagements: Escape from Denmark; Battle of Valmaseda; Battle of Espinosa

Commanders
- Notable commanders: Marquis of La Romana, Joaquín Blake y Joyes

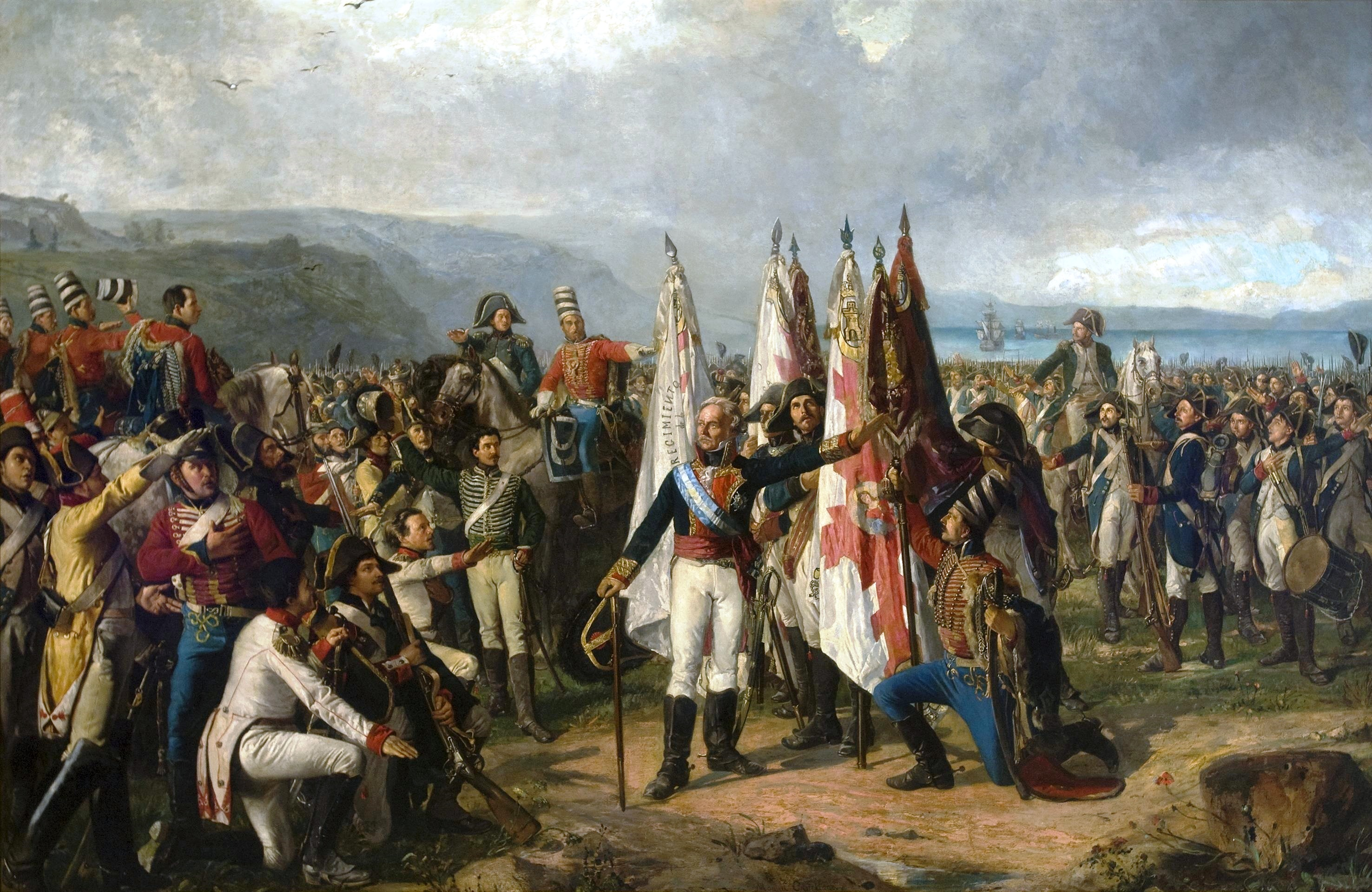
The Division of the North. Oil painting by Manuel Castellano (c. 1870). Collection of Museo del Prado

The Division of the North (Spanish: División del Norte) was a Spanish division, made up of fourteen battalions of infantry and five regiments of cavalry, "all completed to war strength", that existed between 1807 and 1808.

Spain was, at that time, an ally of France and the division, composed of 15,000 men under the command of Pedro Caro, 3rd Marquis of la Romana, was initially deployed, between 1807 and 1808, to perform garrison duties in Hamburg under Marshal Bernadotte. In March 1808, along with a Franco-Belgian unit of approximately the same size, the unit was deployed to Denmark, with the two-fold objective of protecting that country, also an ally of Napoleon, and preparing for an invasion of Sweden.

After La Romana learned about the outbreak of the Peninsular War, he decided to have the British transport the division back to Spain. The majority of the division returned to Spain and fought in the early part of the Peninsular War.

== Organization ==
Regiment	Manpower	Station
Line Infantry
I, II, III / Asturias	2,332	Zealand
I, II, III / Guadalaxara	2,282	Zealand
I, II, III / Princesa	2,282	Nyborg, Kerteminde, Middelfart
I, II, III / Zamora	2,256	Veile, Fredericia, Kolding
Light Infantry
I, II / Voluntarios de Cataluña	2,440	Svendborg, Langeland
Line Cavalry
Rey	540	Horsens, Skanderborg, Aarhus
Infante	540	Randers, Mariager
Algarve	540	Tønder, Husum, Torrig
Almansa Dragoons	540	Faaborg
Villaviciosa Dragoons	540	Bogense

== Return to Spain ==
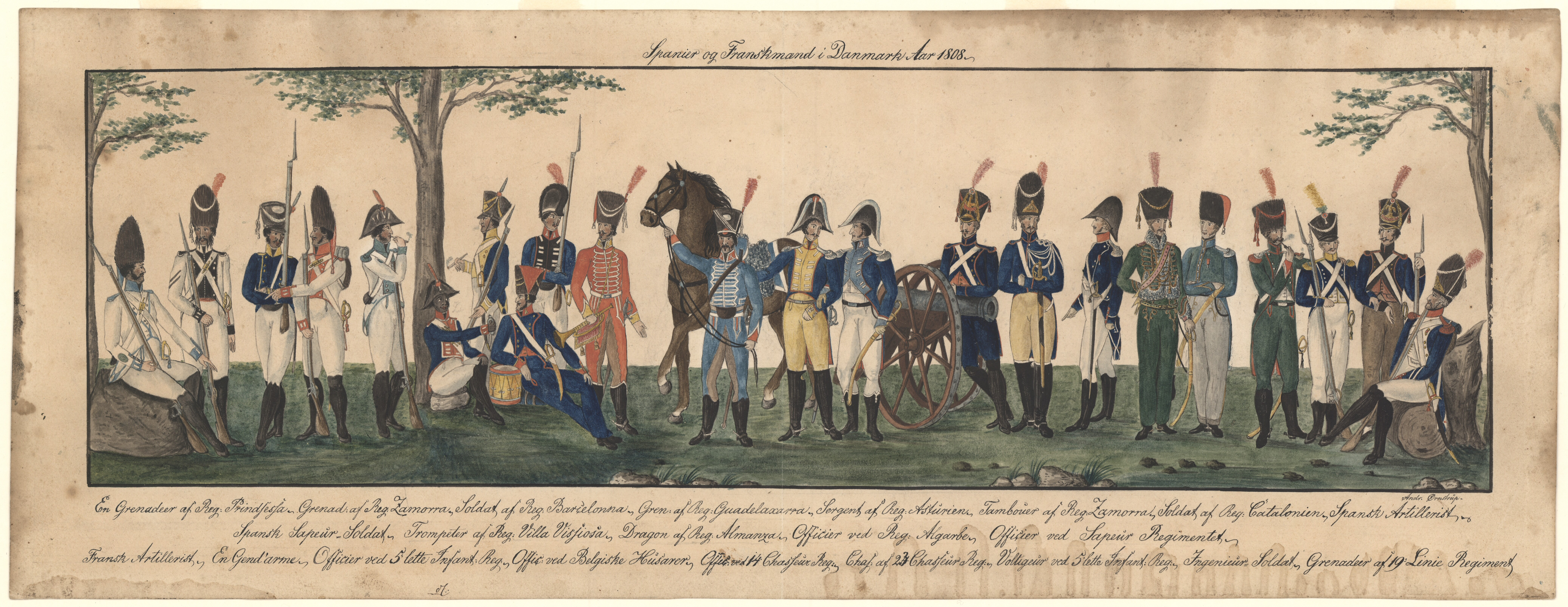
Spanish and French regiments in Denmark, 1808.

While the Division was in Denmark, the Peninsular War broke out on 2 May 1808. Once La Romana learned of the changed situation, he made plans with the British to return the Division to Spain. The Marquis contacted Rear-Admiral Richard Goodwin Keats, on his flagship Superb, and on 9 August 1808 the Spaniards seized the fort and town of Nyborg. Keats' squadron then took possession of the port and organized the transportation of the Spanish back to their home country. Some 9,000 men of the 15,000-strong division were immediately able to board British ships on 27 August and ultimately escape to Spain. Their defection reduced Bernadotte's "Hanseatic Army" to a string of glorified coastal garrisons, severely sapping Napoleon's left (north) wing in the contest with Austria for mastery over Central Europe in 1809.

By October 11, La Romana and his 9,000 men had all concentrated at Santander, Spain. The Division reinforced Lieutenant-General Joaquín Blake, whose Army of Galicia was in retreat from superior French armies in Cantabria. At the Battle of Valmaseda, which took place on 5 November 1808, Blake suddenly turned on his pursuers to rescue a trapped detachment and defeated a division of Marshal Claude-Victor Perrin's army.

The Division then participated in the Battle of Espinosa, fought on 10 and 11 November at the township of Espinosa de los Monteros in the Cantabrian Mountains. The battle resulted in Marshal Victor defeating Blake. Blake, to his credit, led his remaining men through an heroic retreat west through the mountains, escaping Marshal Jean-de-Dieu Soult's pursuit. However, when he arrived at León on 23 November, only 10,000 men remained under his banner.

== See also ==
- Army of Spain (Peninsular War)
