= François Joseph Lefebvre =

French Marshal (1755–1820)

Marshal of the Empire François Joseph Lefebvre Duke of Danzig
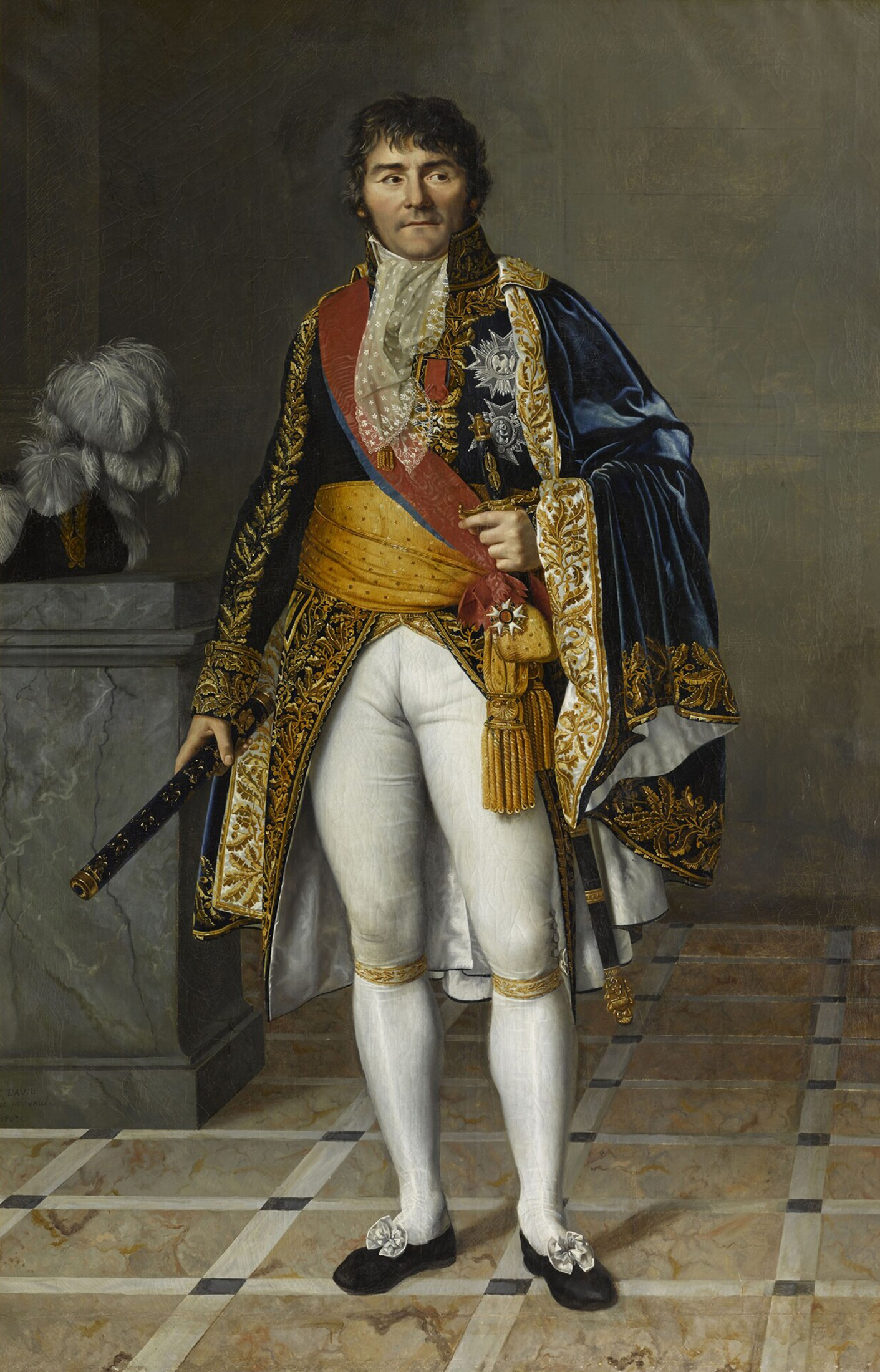
- Portrait by Césarine Davin-Mirvault (1807)
- Born: 25 October 1755; Rouffach, France
- Died: 14 September 1820 (aged 64); Paris, France
- Burial place: Père Lachaise Cemetery, Paris
- Military career
- Allegiance: France
- Branch: Army
- Service years: 1773–1814
- Rank: Marshal of the Empire
- Commands: Army of Sambre and Meuse; X Corps; IV Corps
- Conflicts: See battles: French Revolutionary Wars; War of the First Coalition; Battle of Fleurus; War of the Second Coalition; Battle of Ostrach; Battle of Stockach; Napoleonic Wars; War of the Fourth Coalition; Battle of Jena-Auerstedt; Siege of Danzig; Peninsular War; Battle of Zornoza; Battle of Valmaseda; Battle of Espinosa; War of the Fifth Coalition; Battle of Teugen-Hausen; Battle of Abensberg; Battle of Landshut; Battle of Eckmühl; Battle of Ratisbon; Battle of Wörgl; Battle of Wagram; Tyrolean Rebellion; Battles of Bergisel; French Invasion of Russia; War of the Sixth Coalition; Six Days' Campaign; Battle of Champaubert; Battle of Montmirail; Battle of Montereau; Battle of Arcis-sur-Aube
- Awards: Grand Cross of the Legion of Honour

François Joseph Lefebvre, Duke of Danzig (English: /ləˈfɛvrə/ lə-FEV-rə, French: [fʁɑ̃swa ʒozɛf ləfɛvʁ]; 25 October 1755 – 14 September 1820) was a French military commander of the French Revolutionary Wars and the Napoleonic Wars, and one of the original eighteen Marshals of the Empire created by Napoleon.

== Early life ==
Lefebvre was born on 28 May 1755 in Rouffach, Alsace, the son of a miller and retired hussar. Orphaned at a young age, he was raised by an uncle who, himself a priest, unsuccessfully tried to lead him to a career in the church. After working as a clerk to the prosecutor of Colmar, Lefebvre enlisted in the French Guards in 1773. As a commoner, Lefebvre had little prospect for advancement; he was promoted to corporal in 1777 and to sergeant in 1788. In 1783 he married Cathérine Hübscher, with whom he had 14 children, although all predeceased him. According to Louise Fusil: his last son, a general, died in Vilna on 19 December 1812.

Lefebvre was in Paris at the time of the Storming of the Bastille in 1789 and, like his close friend, Michel Ordener, he embraced the French Revolution. After his unit was disbanded early in the Revolution, Lefebvre entered the newly-formed National Guard of Paris, obtaining the rank of lieutenant, and was injured defending King Louis XVI during a popular uprising. He was soon transferred to a regular infantry regiment.

== French Revolutionary Wars ==
Lefebvre held the rank of captain at the start of the War of the First Coalition in 1792. He quickly rose through the ranks, receiving his promotion to brigade general on 2 December 1793. Assigned to the Army of the Moselle, he took part in the Battle of Fleurus on 24 June 1794, and thereafter served on the Rhine front for the next years. After General Lazare Hoche's death, in September 1797, Lefebvre was appointed commander of the Army of Sambre and Meuse. He then commanded the vanguard of the Army of the Danube under Jean-Baptiste Jourdan in March 1799, although for the first week of the campaign he was incapacitated with ringworm and Dominique Vandamme replaced him temporarily. He was later injured at the Battle of Ostrach where the Advance Guard bore the brunt of the early fighting.

In May 1799, Lefebvre, by then a well-known general of division, entered politics and was elected to the Council of Five Hundred, even presenting himself as a candidate for a seat in the Directory in replacement of Jean Baptiste Treilhard. He failed to be elected but was appointed Military governor of Paris. In this role, Lefebvre agreed to support Napoleon Bonaparte and was crucial for the success of his coup d'état of 18 Brumaire. In 1800, his loyalty to Bonaparte was rewarded with a seat in the Sénat conservateur. He bought Château de Combault for use as his home in 1802.

== Napoleonic Wars ==
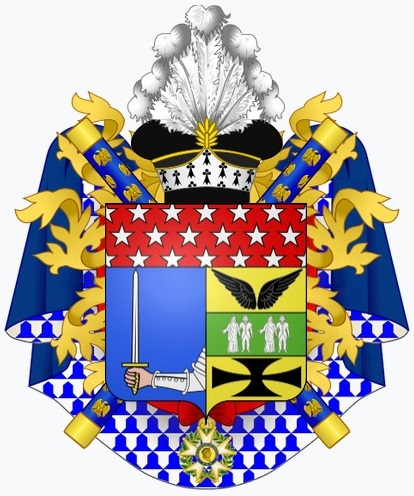
Heraldic achievement of François-Joseph Lefebvre, Duke of Danzig

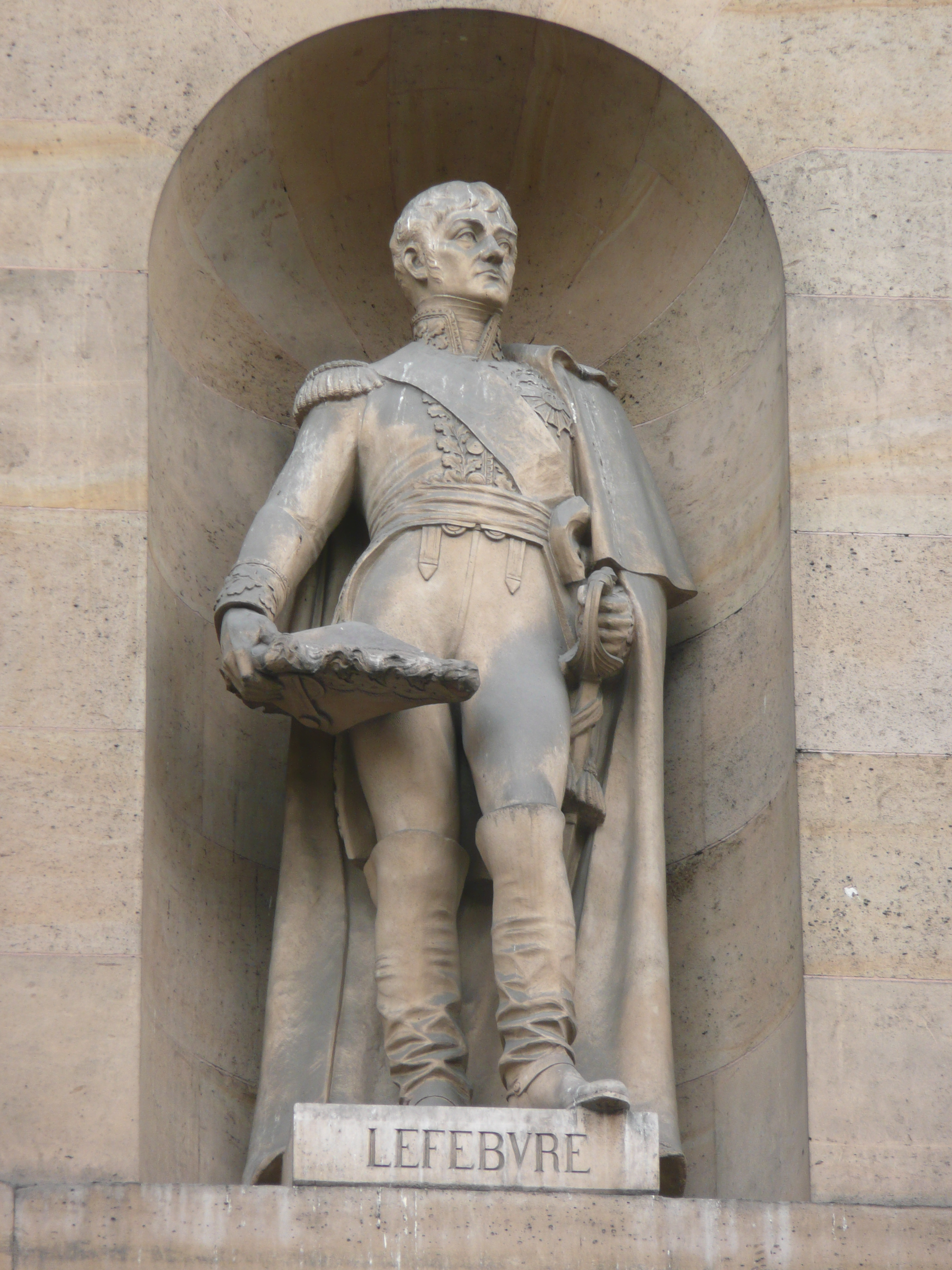
Statue of Lefebvre at the Louvre Palace, Paris

On 19 May 1804, Lefebvre was one of four senators to be made a Marshal of the Empire. He presented the Joyeuse to Napoleon in his coronation as emperor on 2 December. For the duration of the War of the Third Coalition, Lefebvre commanded a reserve corps in Mainz as well as three departments on the left bank of the Rhine. He was appointed commander of the Imperial Guard's infantry in the campaign of 1806, during the War of the Fourth Coalition.

On 23 January 1807 he received the order to capture Danzig. At the head of the X Corps, Lefebvre captured the city on 24 May after a two-month siege. Four days later, Napoleon awarded him the victory title "Duke of Danzig" (Duc de Dantzig). In 1808, Lefebvre took part in Napoleon's campaign in the Peninsular War, defeating the Spanish at the Battle of Zornoza on 31 October 1808. He commanded the Bavarian Army against the Austrians in 1809 during the War of the Fifth Coalition, fighting at the battles of Arnhofen, Eckmühl, and Wagram. That same year, Lefebvre was tasked with suppressing the Tyrolean Rebellion, but was replaced in this command by Drouet d'Erlon after a series of setbacks.

Lefebvre commanded the infantry of the Old Guard in the 1812 French invasion of Russia, and fought at the Battle of Borodino. He served in the German campaign (1813) and in the French north-east campaign (1814) of the War of the Sixth Coalition, and voted for the emperor's deposition at the Senate in April 1814. After the first Bourbon Restoration he was made Peer of France by King Louis XVIII (4 June 1814), but rallied to Napoleon during the Hundred Days.

== Later life ==
Lefebvre was excluded from the Chamber of Peers during the second Restoration. However, he retained his rank of marshal. Louis XVIII restored his peerage on 5 March 1819. He died in Paris on 14 September 1820, and was buried near André Masséna at the Père-Lachaise Cemetery.

He never forgot the risks he undertook that brought him rank and wealth. When a friend expressed envy of his estate, Lefebvre said, "Come down in the courtyard, and I'll have ten shots at you with a musket at 30 paces. If I miss, the whole estate is yours." After the friend declined this offer, Lefebvre added, "I had a thousand bullets shot at me from much closer range before I got all this."

== In popular culture ==
Lefebvre is portrayed by Yves Montand in Sacha Guitry's 1955 film Napoléon.

In the 1931 anthology If It Had Happened Otherwise, the alternate history scenario "If the Moors in Spain Had Won" by Philip Guedalla has Napoleon appointing Lefebvre as King Youssef I of Granada after deposing the House of Boabdil, only to trigger an analog of the Peninsular War.

Military offices
Preceded by Jean-Antoine Marbot	Military governor of Paris; 1799–1800	Succeeded by Édouard Mortier
