= Jesús Arredondo Velázquez =

Mexican politician

- Born: 22 June 1964 (age 61); Querétaro, Mexico
- Occupation: Politician
- Political party: PAN

Jesús Arredondo Velázquez (born 22 June 1964) is a Mexican politician from the National Action Party. From 2006 to 2009 he served as Deputy of the LX Legislature of the Mexican Congress representing Querétaro.
