= Arcelia Arredondo García =

Mexican politician (born 1957)

Deputy of the Congress of the Union for Guanajuato
- In office 28 August 2000 – 31 August 2003

Personal details
- Born: 17 April 1957 (age 68) Guanajuato, Mexico
- Party: PAN
- Occupation: Politician

Arcelia Arredondo García (born 17 April 1957) is a Mexican politician from the National Action Party. From 2000 to 2003 she served as Deputy of the LVIII Legislature of the Mexican Congress representing Guanajuato.
