= Ricardo Arredondo Calmache =

Spanish painter (1850–1911)

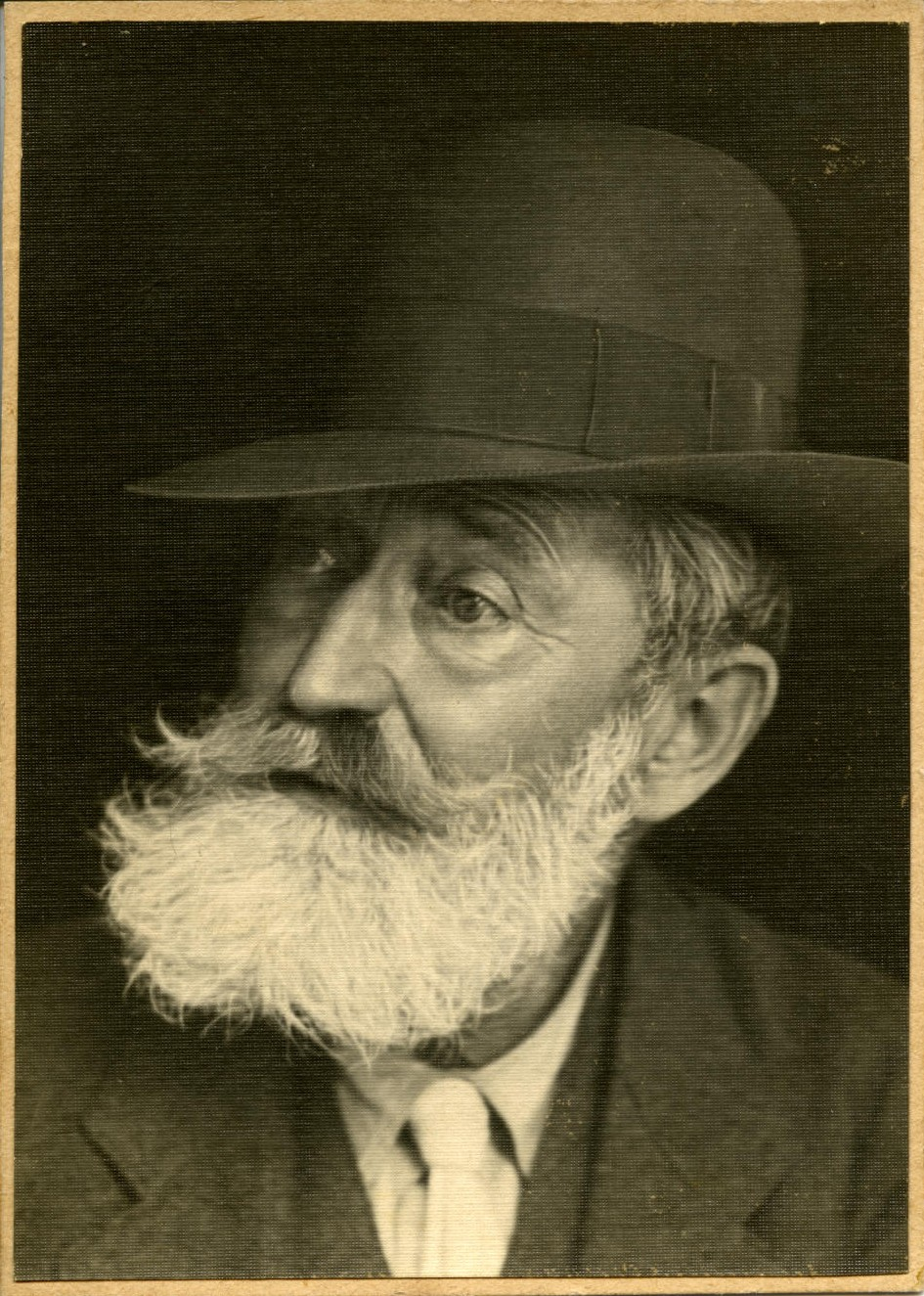
Ricardo Arredondo (date unknown)

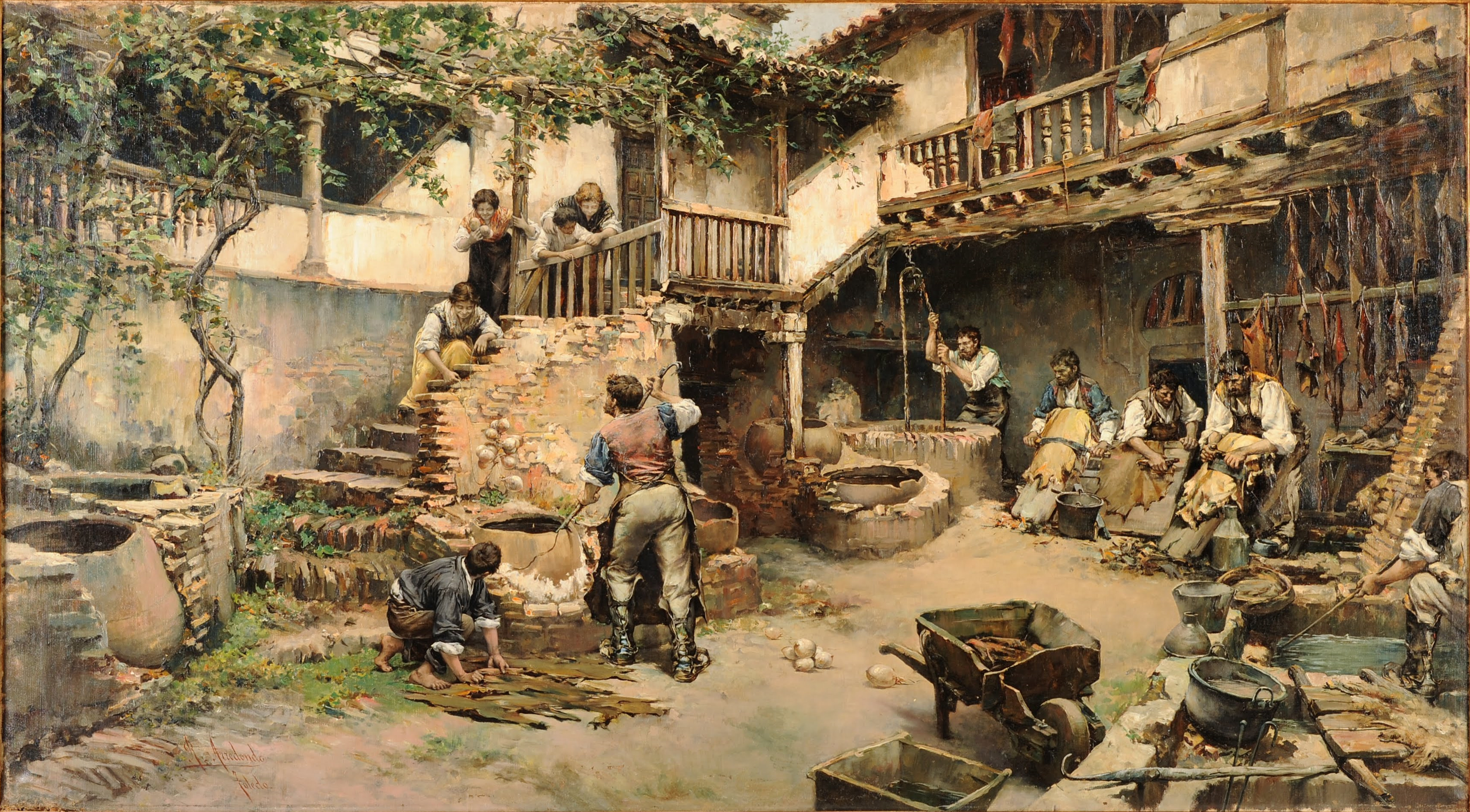
Tanners' Workshop

Ricardo Arredondo Calmache (23 October 1850 – 1911) was a Spanish painter who specialized in landscapes and costumbrista scenes; known for his meticulous attention to detail.

== Biography ==
He was born in Cella. His father was a veteran of the First Carlist War. His uncle was a priest who later became a canon in Toledo. With his support, the family moved to Toledo when Arredondo was twelve years old. He refused to enter a military cadet school and took art lessons from Matías Moreno until he was able to enroll at the "Escuela Especial de Pintura, Escultura y Grabado de Madrid", where he studied with Carlos de Haes. He then travelled to Paris, where he associated with the circle of Ernest Meissonier and was exposed to the influence of the Barbizon school.

Upon returning to Spain, he participated in the National Exhibition of Fine Arts and would continue to be a regular participant for the next two decades. He also travelled throughout Spain, creating drawings for a major publishing project that never came to fruition.

Upon the death of his uncle, who had become Chaplain to the King, he inherited a small fortune. He used the money to buy and refurbish a dilapidated mansion. Gregorio Marañón described him as a man who rarely sold any paintings, but enjoyed regaling his friends; notably the writer Benito Pérez Galdós, for whom he served as a sort of "cicerone".

He also served as a municipal councillor and was a member of the Monument Commission, where he oversaw restoration of the Puerta de Bisagra Nueva. This brought him a corresponding membership in the Real Academia de Bellas Artes. His numerous cityscapes and landscapes around the Tagus River earned him the title "Pintor de Toledo". He died in Madrid.
