= Victor A. Arredondo =

Victor A. Arredondo Alvarez,, former Minister of Education at the State of Veracruz, Mexico (2004-2010), and former President of the Corporate Villa Aprendizaje (Learning Village), is now an educational consultant.

He holds a bachelor’s and a master's degree in psychology and a Ph.D. in educational psychology from Universidad Veracruzana, Western Michigan University and West Virginia University, respectively. He has served as president of Universidad Veracruzana (1997-2004), general director for Higher Education at the Federal Ministry of Public Education (SEP, 1992-1997) and academic chairman at Mexico’s National Association of Universities and Institutes of Higher Education (ANUIES, 1980-1984).

He was Mexico’s founding member of the Trilateral Steering Committee for Higher Education Cooperation among universities of Canada, USA and Mexico (Wingspread Statement, Sept. 1992: https://link.springer.com/content/pdf/bbm%3A978-94-007-0987-4%2F1.pdf); President of the Inter-American Organization for Higher Education (2003-2005), the most influential university collaboration agency in the American continent; and recipient of academic distinctions from universities of the Americas and Europe.

He developed the “Vasconcelos Program” (virtual mobile classrooms and facilitators supporting rural communities self-sustained development), for which he received the Bill and Melinda Gates Foundation “Access to Learning Award” in 2008; and the “Clavijero Consortium" (in 2005) an on-line public institution exclusively dedicated to offer distance education for conventional and non-conventional students. This Consortium used to offer the highest percentage of online training courses for primary and secondary teachers in Mexico accredited by the official National Catalog for Training Teachers.

Applying ICT throughout the state educational system gained him the 2008 Max Shein award from the Mexican Union of Entrepreneurs engaged in Educational Technology (UNETE, https://www.unete.org/). In 2010, Veracruz educational system, under his leadership, obtained some of the highest increases in Mexico on its average student scores, both in national (ENLACE) and international (PISA) examinations. He is now committed to transferring high impact educational technologies and solutions, through strategic partnerships along Mexico and Latin America.
