= Patricia Arredondo =

American counselling psychologist (born 1945)

Dr. Patricia Arredondo EdD
- Born: July 16, 1945; Lorain, Ohio
- Education: Boston University (Ed.D.)
- Known for: Cultural competencies, social justice advocacy, women's leadership, immigrant and Latinx mental health, and Diversity strategy in the workplace
- Awards: Derald Wing Sue Distinguished Contributions to Multicultural Counseling Award (2019); PsySR Anthony J. Marsella Award (2018); The Patricia Arredondo Diversity & Equity Speaker Series, Arizona State University (2016); SCP Elder Recognition Award (2015); NLPA Distinguished Madrina Recognition (2014); APA Henry Tomes Award (2013); NLPA Distinguished Professional Career Award (2004)
- Scientific career
- Fields: Counseling psychology; Multicultural psychology
- Institutions: Arizona State University (2016–present)
- Thesis: Psychological Education and the Foreign-Born Adolescent (1978)
- Doctoral advisor: Dr. Ralph Mosher
- Other academic advisors: Dr. Augusto Blasi and Dr. Maria Elena Brisk
- Doctoral students: Drs. Veronica Bordes Edgar, Dan Rosen, Tiffany Rice, Marie Rutter
- Other notable students: Drs. Lisa Sanchez-Johnsen, Ed Delgado Romero, Cynthia Guzman
- Website: Arredondoadvisorygroup.com

Patricia Arredondo (born July 16, 1945) is an American counseling psychologist, primarily recognized for her efforts in developing the area of multicultural counseling. She has been recognized in the field of psychology for her contributions to the advancement of Ethnic Minority Psychology. She has been associated with the APA (American Psychological Association), and the National Hispanic Psychological Association along with many other associations. She is the 2018 recipient of the Anthony J. Marsella Award from the Psychologists for Social Responsibility.

== Early life ==
Patricia Arredondo was born on July 16, 1945, in Lorain, Ohio to parents Apolinar Arredondo Orozco and Evarista Zaldívar. Patricia was the second born of seven siblings. Her father Apolinar encouraged his children to keep their Mexican roots by speaking Spanish, learning about their history and traditional dances. This quickly ignited her interest in the studies of different culture and traditions. On the other hand, her mother Evarista encouraged her children to follow a more American life style due to the discrimination she frequently faced while growing up. Patricia shared a close relationship with her father due to his egalitarian views. He taught his children equally regardless their gender.

Although Patricia was not the firstborn she carried a lot of responsibilities as her eldest sister had a mental illness, at the time referred to as emotional issues. As an adult her sister was eventually diagnosed with paranoid schizophrenia.

Growing up Patricia was taught to take pride in her work and to have the desire to change the world. She was a very aspiring student and, at times, when under stress from her mother, she sought refuge in the library. There she could learn and experience what ever she pleased; she often found herself reading about Boston, a city she dreamed of relocating to. She used this desire to fuel her academics, putting her in the top third of her class in high school.

== Education ==
Patricia's mother's believed in education for new opportunities which is why all of the children went to Catholic school. With her parents support and ambivalence, she went to college two hours away from Lorain. Patricia Arredondo attended Kent State University where she obtained her undergraduate degree in Journalism and Spanish. Soon after graduating she decided to take a job teaching Spanish in Brookline, Massachusetts. Patricia enjoyed her new job in Brookline as it was really close to her dream town of Boston. It wasn't long before Patricia needed a challenge so she decided to enroll at Boston College to pursue a masters program in school counseling, due to the positive experience she had with her counselors growing up. While she completed her studies she became more aware of the lack of ethnic knowledge in terms of individual counseling. She soon decided to further her education this time by attending Boston University to obtain her doctoral degree in counseling psychology. During her time at Boston University Patricia participated in the bilingual fellowship program, to further her studies in ethnic differences. Finally in 1978 Patricia obtained her doctorate being the first in her family to do so.

== Career ==
Patricia Arredondo began her career shortly after graduating from Boston University in 1978. She relocated to the nearby state of New Hampshire taking a job as an assistant professor at the University of New Hampshire. In 1979 Patricia relocated back to Boston taking a job at Boston University as an assistant professor. She remained in the same job position until 1985 when Patricia decided to fund her own company, Empowerment workshops INC. The goal of the company was to provide companies with strategies to increase diversity within the workplace.

After many years working for herself in 1999 Patricia Arredondo returned to teaching this time as a professor at Arizona State University. She remained in the same position for a couple of years until 2006, when she was given the position of Deputy Vice President and University Dean for Student Affairs at Arizona State University. She remained in the same position until 2007 when she accepted a job at the University of Wisconsin-Milwaukee as interim Dean of the School of Continuing Education and Associate Vice Chancellor for Academic Affairs.

Several years later in 2013 Patricia relocated to Chicago accepting a position as president in the Chicago School of Professional Psychology. Patricia remained in the position until 2015 when it was eliminated. In 2016 she returned as a professor at Arizona State University.

== Awards ==
- 2004 — NLPA (National Latina/o Psychological Association), Distinguished Professional Career Award
- 2013 — APA, Henry Tomes Award for Distinguished Lifetime Contributions to Ethnic Minority Psychology
- 2014 — NLPA (National Latina/o Psychological Association), Distinguished Madrina Recognition for outstanding lifetime achievement
- 2015 — SCP (Society of Counseling Psychology) APA Division 17, Elder Recognition Award
