= Battle of Espinosa de los Monteros =

1808 Battle of the Peninsular War

- Part of the Peninsular War
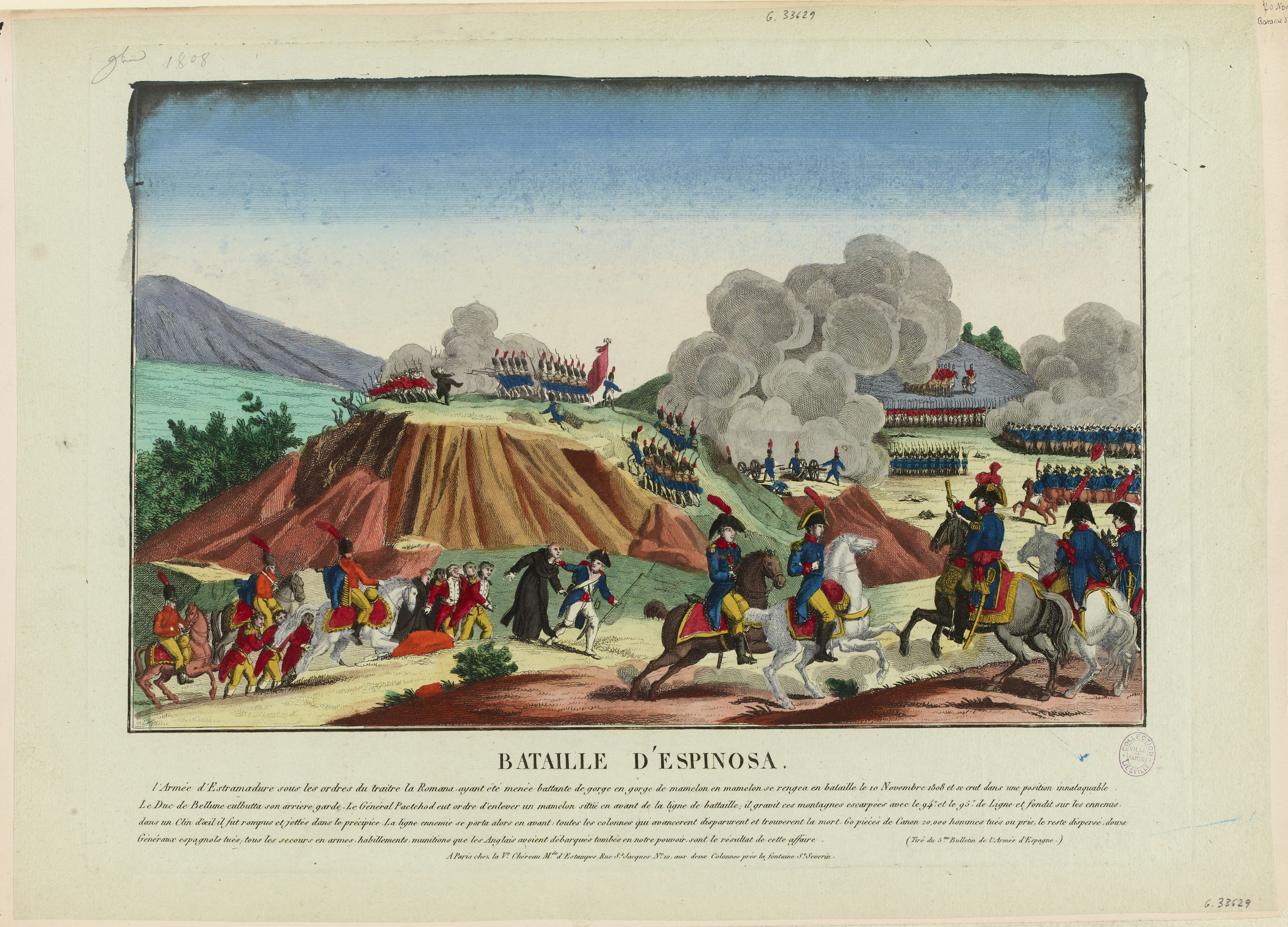
Date	10–11 November 1808
Location	Espinosa de los Monteros, northeast of Castile and Leon, Spain 43.0667°N 3.5333°W
Result	French victory

Belligerents
(First French Empire) French Empire	Spain

Commanders and leaders
(First French Empire) Claude Victor	Joaquín Blake; Pedro Caro, 3rd Marquis of la Romana

Strength
21,000	23,000

Casualties and losses
1,100	5,400

Peninsular War: Napoleon's invasion
current battle

The Battle of Espinosa de los Monteros took place during the Napoleonic Wars, on 10 and 11 November 1808 at the village of Espinosa de los Monteros in the Cantabrian Mountains. It resulted in a French victory under Marshal Victor against Lieutenant General Joaquín Blake's Army of Galicia.

== Background ==
The Dos de Mayo Uprising had put Iberia in revolt against French rule. The Spanish conventional warfare had started at El Bruch (June 1808), while the Battle of Bailen (July 1808) marked the first open-field defeat of a Napoleonic army. British intervention had started at Roliça (August 1808), and Napoleon's personal participation in the invasion of Spain started with the engagement of Joaquín Blake's forces at Zornoza.

== Battle ==
Victor launched a series of attacks on the first day that were thrown back with heavy losses by the disciplined regulars of General La Romana's Division of the North. By nightfall, Blake's positions still held. On the morning of 11 November, Victor regained his composure and coordinated a massive French attack that pierced Blake's left wing and drove the Spaniards from the field.

General Acevedo launched a counterattack, with two brigades of the Asturian division, some five thousand troops each, commanded by Cayetano Valdés y Flores and Gregorio Bernaldo de Quirós. The troops headed downhill into a barrage of musket-fire from Maison's brigade of fusiliers, resulting in the Spanish commanding officers, at the head of their raw recruits, bearing the brunt of the fire; General Quirós was killed and both Valdés and Acevedo were seriously wounded, the latter blinded. The defeated Army of the Left suffered over five thousand casualties.

Blake led his remaining men through a heroic retreat west through the mountains to escape Soult's pursuit. However, when Blake arrived at León on 23 November, only 20,000 of his men remained, in an extremely bad condition.

== Aftermath ==
Napoleon's invasion of Spain proceeded with the Battle of Tudela.

== In popular culture ==
- The Gun, by C. S. Forester (author of the Horatio Hornblower series), begins with the Spanish retreat from Espinoza.

== See also ==
- Timeline of the Peninsular War

== Bibliography ==
- Bodart, Gaston (1908). Militär-historisches Kriegs-Lexikon (1618-1905).
- Esdaile, Charles J. (2003). The Peninsular War. Palgrave MacMillan. ISBN 978-1-4039-6231-7.

Preceded by Battle of Gamonal (Burgos)	Napoleonic Wars; Battle of Espinosa de los Monteros	Succeeded by Battle of Tudela
