= Joaquín Blake =

Spanish military officer

Joaquín Blake y Joyes
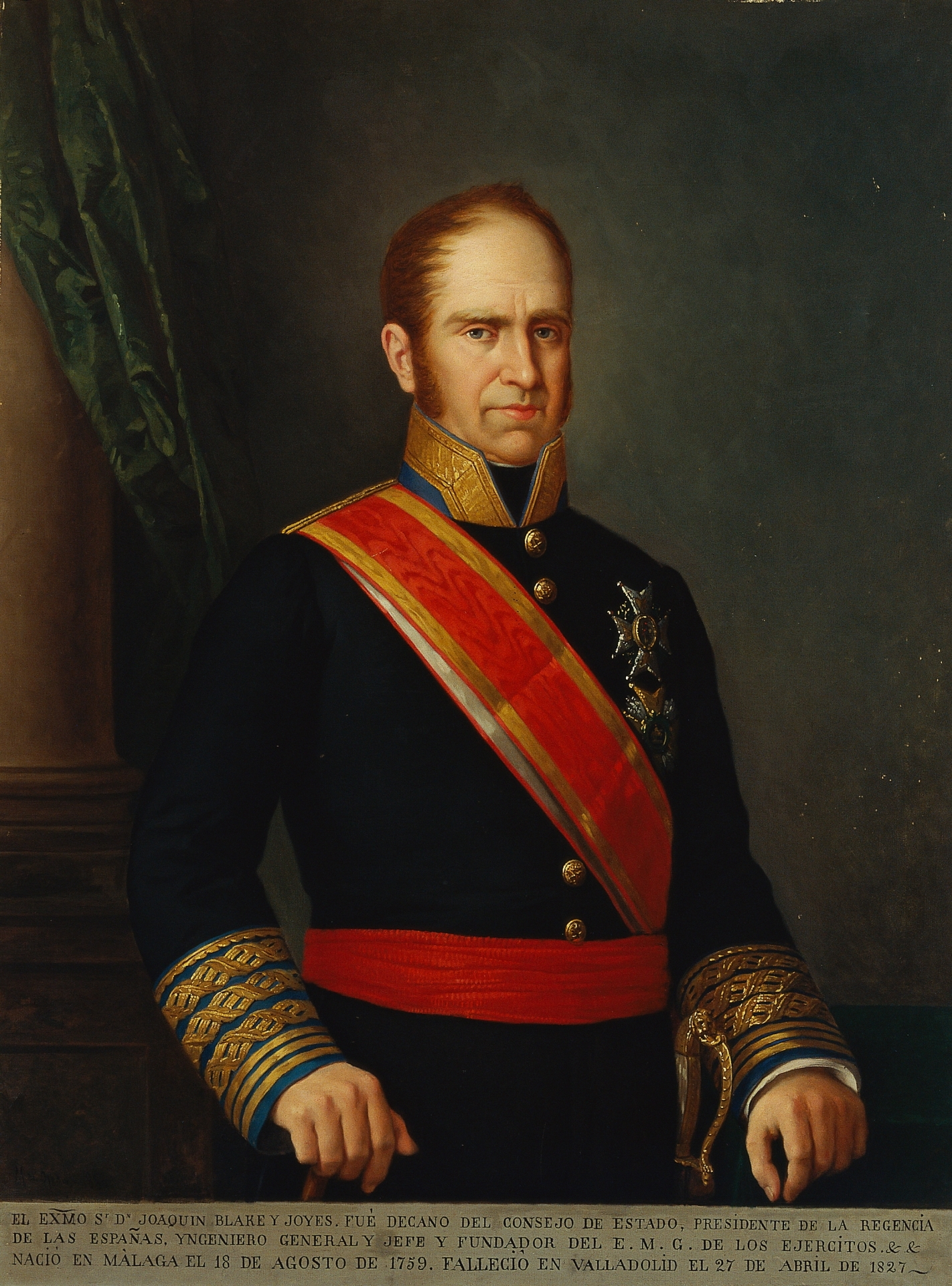
- Born: 19 August 1759; Vélez-Málaga, Spain
- Died: 27 April 1827 (aged 67); Valladolid, Spain
- Military career
- Allegiance: Spain
- Rank: Lieutenant general
- Commands: Army of Galicia
- Conflicts: American Revolutionary War; Great Siege of Gibraltar; Invasion of Minorca; War of the Pyrenees; Battle of Sant Llorenç de la Muga; Peninsular War; Battle of Medina de Rioseco; Battle of Zornoza; Battle of Valmaseda; Battle of Espinosa de los Monteros; Battle of Albuera

Joaquín Blake y Joyes (19 August 1759 – 27 April 1827) was a Spanish military officer who served with distinction in the French Revolutionary and Peninsular wars.

== Early military career ==
Partially of Irish descent his mother was from Galicia and his father had some Irish ancestry, Blake was born at Vélez-Málaga to an aristocratic family. In his youth, he saw action as a lieutenant of the grenadiers in the American Revolutionary War, taking part in the reconquest of Minorca and the failed siege of Gibraltar against the British.

At the outbreak of war with France in 1793, Blake, a captain, took part in the invasion of Roussillon under General Ricardos. He was wounded at San-Lorenzo-de-la-Muga in 1794.

In 1802 he was promoted to brigadier in the same promotion as the Count of Caldagues and two of the Palafox brothers, Luis Palafox, Marquis of Lazán and Francisco Palafox.

== Peninsular War ==
Exploits in the field led to further promotions, and by the start of the Peninsular War in 1808, Blake held the rank of lieutenant general. He was appointed head of the Supreme Junta's Army of Galicia (a paper force of 43,001 holding the Spanish left wing along the Cantabrian mountains) during the French invasions and fought well against Napoleon's Grande Armée despite the heavy odds against him.

Blake and Cuesta were defeated at Medina del Rio Seco on 14 July. Following the general French retreat prompted by the disaster at Bailén, Blake took up positions opposite the enemy on the banks of the Ebro. On 31 October Marshal Lefebvre's IV Corps fell upon Blake's 19,000 men at Battle of Zornoza, turning back the hesitant Spanish advance. To his credit, Blake retreated swiftly and in good order, preventing Napoleon's planned envelopment and annihilation of the Spanish flank.

Furious, the Emperor dispatched Lefebvre and Victor in pursuit, the latter ordered to outmaneuver Blake and sweep across his line of retreat. The French were careless and allowed their forces to disperse during the pursuit. On 5 November Blake surprised his enemies again when, at Valmaseda, he suddenly turned about and attacked the French vanguard with seasoned troops, inflicting a stinging defeat on General Vilatte's leading division. However, another French corps then joined the chase, and Blake raced west once more to evade encirclement.

Blake chose to make another stand at Espinosa on 10 November. Victor, intent on avenging himself for his earlier humiliations at the hands of Blake, spent the day recklessly flinging his divisions against the Spaniards without success. The next day, however, a well-coordinated French attack shattered Blake's center and drove his army from the field in rout.

Blake lost 3,001 men on the battlefield, and many thousands more were dispersed in the confusion of retreat as the Spanish front disintegrated. Knowing the Army of Galicia to be irreparably shattered, Blake embarked on a grueling march west into the hills, outdistancing his pursuers under Soult. He reached Léon on 23 November with only 10,000 men. Command of what remained of the Army of Galicia then passed to General Pedro Caro y Sureda, 3rd marquis de La Romana.

=== Battle of Albuera ===
In 1810, Blake participated in the creation of a Spanish General Staff which, in the final years of the war began to restore coherence to the country's military enterprises. Poor battlefield performance had in large part been caused by the lethargy, mismanagement, and miscoordination of Spain's fragmented military administration.

On 16 May 1811 Blake fought the French at Albuera alongside William Beresford's Anglo–Portuguese army. The Spaniards under Blake's command successfully held the allied flank against a strong French infantry, earning him promotion to captain general.

=== Siege of Valencia (1812) ===
Blake was then transferred to eastern Spain to combat Marshal Suchet's advance on Valencia. Blake, after several defeats, ended up trapped in the city with his army, eventually surrendering on 8 January 1812 with his 16,000 troops, marking the high point of the French Army's successes in eastern Spain.

Blake was sent to the donjon at Vincennes, where he was kept captive until April 1814.

== Later life ==
In 1815 Blake was made Chief Engineer of the Spanish Royal Army. He died in 1827 in Valladolid, Castile and León.

== See also ==
- The Tribes of Galway
