= Army of Galicia =

Spanish field army (Peninsular War)

The Army of Galicia (Spanish: Ejército de Galicia) was a Spanish field army that took part in the Peninsular War against Napoleon’s French Grande Armée.

Created by the Supreme Junta towards the end of June 1808 to hold the Spanish left wing along the Cantabrian mountains against Napoleon's forces, it had a paper force of 43,000 regulars. Command was first given to General Blake, and then, in November 1808, to General La Romana.

== Battle of Medina del Rio Seco ==
Following the defeat of General Cuesta's small and inexperienced Army of Castile at the Battle of Cabezón, which had forced Cuesta to abandon his seat of command at Valladolid to General Lasalle and escape to Benavente, Blake was ordered to combine the troops of his newly formed army with what was left of Cuesta's forces. Blake had initially turned down a request to do so as the troops were still undergoing training and far short of their full numbers.

Setting off with 27,000 foot soldiers and 150 cavalrymen, and after having left troops at different garrisons along the way, especially to guard the gorges, by the time Blake met up with Cuesta at Benavente, their combined forces totalled 22,000 men.

Moreover, imposing his seniority against the younger Blake's objections, Cuesta claimed supreme command and insisted on a foolhardy march on Valladolid to reclaim his lost city. Setting his columns marching on July 12, he laid his new, combined force vulnerable to a French counterattack. Paralyzed by disunity of command, the Spanish troops were defeated on 14 July at Medina de Rioseco, mainly due to Cuesta having failed to close the gap between his troops and Blake's.

== Bilbao ==
On 11 October 1808, Blake personally entered Bilbao, forcing General Merlin to retreat 32 kilometres (20 mi) up the valley of Durango to Zornosa. Merlin had entered the city the previous August to suppress the revolt against King Joseph and in doing so, had, in the words of the king himself, ensured that the "fire of insurrection was quenched with the blood of twelve hundred men". These numbers were likely exaggerated as according to the source cited they fire bombed Bilbao port and took vessels from the city.

== Battle of Zornoza ==
Following the French retreat from the disaster at the Battle of Bailén (16–19 July 1808), Blake took up positions opposite the enemy on the banks of the Ebro. On 31 October, the 24,000 men of Marshal Lefebvre's IV Corps attacked Blake's 19,000 men at Zornoza. By retreating swiftly, Blake was able to avoid being trapped by Napoleon's planned envelopment and annihilation of the Spanish flank.

== Battle of Valmaseda ==
Napoleon, reaching Vitoria on 8 November, to take matters in hand personally, had dispatched Lefebvre and Victor in pursuit of Blake, with Victor having orders to outmanoeuvre Blake and sweep across his line of retreat. The French were careless and allowed their forces to disperse during the pursuit. On 5 November, Blake surprised his enemies again when, at Valmaseda, he suddenly turned on his pursuers and attacked the French vanguard, inflicting a defeat on the leading division. When another French corps approached, Blake went west once more to evade encirclement.

== Battle of Espinosa ==
Having successfully managed, with the help of the Royal Navy, to reach Santander with 9,000 men, of the 15,000-strong Division of the North stationed in Denmark, La Romana was given command of the Army of Galicia on 11 November 1808.

However, that same day, still effectively under Blake, the Army of Galicia was severely beaten at Espinosa de los Monteros, 100 kilometres (62 mi) away in the Cantabrian Mountains, where Blake had chosen to make another stand on 10 November. Victor, trying to avenge himself for his earlier humiliations at the hands of Blake, spent the day recklessly flinging his divisions against the Spanish troops without success. The next day, however, a well-coordinated French attack shattered Blake's centre and routed his army.

Blake lost 3,000 men in the battle, and many thousands more were dispersed in the confusion of retreat. Knowing his Army of Galicia to be irreparably shattered, Blake marched west into the hills, outdistancing his pursuers, under Soult, and managing to carry out important rearguard actions to help General Moore's retreat to Corunna.

Blake reached Léon on 23 November with only 10,000 men and command was then passed to General La Romana, who took command of the new Ejército de la Izquierda on 26 November. The following year, in July 1809, this army would also incorporate the Asturian regiments under Francisco Ballesteros.

== Battle of Villafranca (17 March 1809) ==
On 17 March 1809, La Romana's troops defeated the French garrison at Villafranca del Bierzo.

Following the defeat of Marshall Ney at the Battle of Puente Sanpayo (7–9 June 1809), Marshal Soult abandoned his attempts to re-establish French rule in Galicia, and when Soult moved against the British on the Portuguese frontier, La Romana was able to drive the French from Asturias as well.

== Battle of San Marcial ==
At San Marcial (31 August 1813), the IV Ejército (IV Army), also known as the Army of Galicia, and under the orders of General Manuel Freire de Andrade, defeated Marshal Soult in what would be his last major offensive against the allied forces led by Wellington. Freire, promoted to general, had succeeded Castaños, who had been called to the Cortes, at the beginning of August 1813.

== See also ==
- Army of Spain (Peninsular War)

== Bibliography ==
- Muñoz Maldonado, José (1833). Historia política y militar de la Guerra de la Independencia de España contra Napoleon Bonaparte desde 1808 á 1814. Tomo III, escrita sobre los documentos auténticos del gobierno por el Dr. D. José Muñoz Maldonado. Madrid: Imprenta de D. José Palacios.
