= Battle of Feistritz =

1816 Austrian-French engagement of War of the Sixth Coalition

- Part of the War of the Sixth Coalition
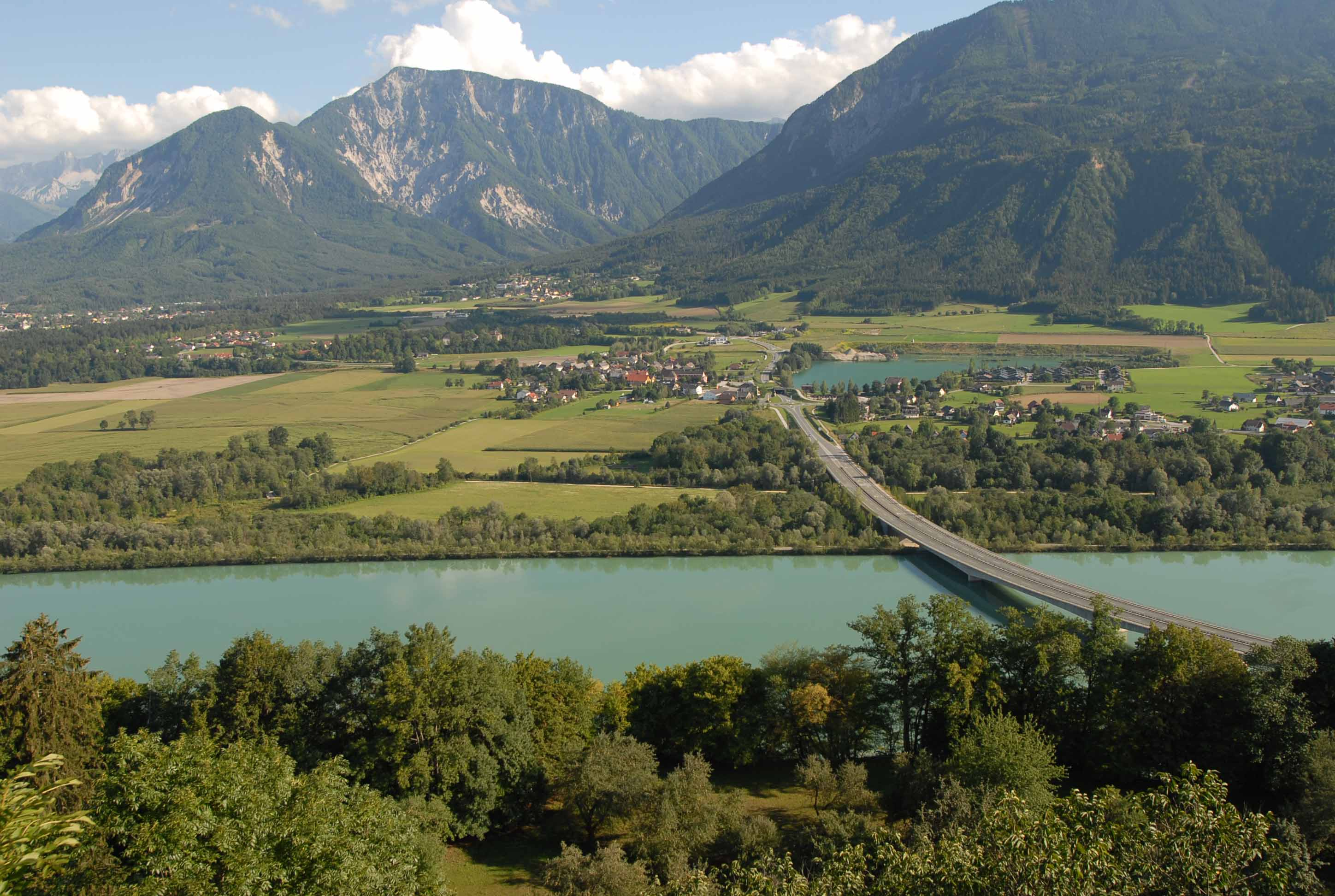
- View from Schloss Hollenburg toward the south bank of the Drava at Kirschentheuer. The Austrian grenadiers crossed a bridge at this location to reinforce Vécsey. Feistritz is located 7 kilometers to the right (west)
Date	6 September 1813
Location	Feistritz im Rosental, Austrian Empire 46°31′N 14°10′E
Result	Franco-Italian victory

Belligerents
(First French Empire) French Empire (Kingdom of Italy (Napoleonic)) Kingdom of Italy	Austrian Empire

Commanders and leaders
(First French Empire) Paul Grenier	(Austrian Empire) August von Vécsey

Strength
15,186; 28 guns	3,300; 8 guns

Casualties and losses
360 killed, wounded or captured	913 killed, wounded or captured

War of the Sixth Coalition: Campaign Italy 1813 1814

The Battle of Feistritz (6 September 1813) saw an Imperial French corps led by Paul Grenier attack an Austrian brigade under August von Vécsey. After putting up a stout resistance, the outnumbered Austrians were defeated and forced to retreat. The clash occurred during the War of the Sixth Coalition, part of the Napoleonic Wars. Feistritz im Rosental is located on the right bank of the Drava River near the southern border of Austria, about 16 kilometres (10 mi) southwest of Klagenfurt. At the time, it was located at the border with the French-controlled Illyrian Provinces to its west and south.

When hostilities commenced between the Austrian Empire and Imperial France, Johann von Hiller led an Austrian army to attack the Illyrian Provinces. The Austrians made rapid gains in the south, but in Carinthia, Hiller's first bridgehead across the Drava River at Villach was eliminated by the Franco-Italian army of Eugène de Beauharnais, the viceroy of the Kingdom of Italy. When the Austrian general established a second bridgehead at Feistritz, Eugène sent Grenier to wipe it out. The minor victory only delayed the inevitable, and within a few weeks Eugène was compelled to abandon Illyria and fall back to the borders of the Kingdom of Italy.

== Background ==
In 1812, the best French and Italian units from the French Army of Italy were assigned to the IV Corps for the French invasion of Russia. The troops fought well under the command of Eugène de Beauharnais but only about 3,000 soldiers survived the campaign. To rebuild his army in Germany for the 1813 campaign, Emperor Napoleon transferred four more divisions from the garrison of Italy to join the newly established IV and XII Corps. The emperor then gave his stepson Eugène permission to organize a new army out of French and Italian draftees to defend the Kingdom of Italy. By May 1813, the new army began forming around the French 46th, 47th, and 48th Divisions, the Italian 49th Division, and one cavalry division. In fact, only 13,000 French conscripts joined the army and the so-called French divisions were largely recruited from areas of Italy that had been annexed by France. Since military equipment was scarce, some soldiers were sent to the front dressed in police uniforms. Nevertheless, the army continued to expand and Eugène eventually renumbered his divisions 1 through 6, with the Italian Royal Guard kept as a discrete unit.

Meanwhile, the Austrian Empire prepared for war with Napoleon by expanding their army. While their main army was based in Bohemia, Austria also stationed one army corps on the Danube and another in the Duchy of Carinthia. The troops in Carinthia were placed under the command of Feldzeugmeister Johann von Hiller and designated the Army of Inner Austria. Since it was considered a minor theater, Hiller's army only counted 35,000 soldiers and 120 artillery pieces in August. This total was smaller than the number of troops in his opponent's army. The Austrian general had veteran division and brigade commanders, but he was handicapped by a clumsy command system and large numbers of indifferently-equipped conscripts in the ranks. Though the Danube corps remained in place, reinforcements were continually switched from there to the Army of Inner Austria throughout the autumn.

In August 1813, Hiller's army consisted of an Advanced Guard under General-major Aron Stanisavlevics and divisions commanded by Feldmarschall-Leutnants Peter Marchal de Perclat, Johann Maria Philipp Frimont, Franz Marziani, Hannibal Sommariva, and Paul von Radivojevich. The Advanced Guard had two Grenz infantry battalions and two hussar squadrons. Marchal's division was made up of a light brigade of one jäger and one Grenz battalion and four hussar squadrons under General-major Christoph Ludwig von Eckhardt and a brigade of four line battalions under General-major Timotheus Winczian. Frimont's division had three brigades led by General-majors Franjo Vlašić, Ferdinand Daniel Pulszky, and August von Vécsey. Vlašić's light brigade comprised one jäger and one Grenz battalion and six hussar squadrons, Pulszky's brigade consisted of four line battalions, and Vécsey's cavalry brigade had 12 squadrons of uhlans.

Marziani's division was made up of a single brigade led by General-major Johann Mayer von Heldensfeld with seven line battalions. Sommariva's division counted three brigades commanded by Generals-major Joseph Xaver von Stutterheim, Joseph von Fölseis, and Georg Johann von Wrede. Stutterheim led four battalions of grenadiers, Fölseis had one Grenz, one line, and one landwehr battalions, and two squadrons of hussars, and Wrede directed 10 squadrons of dragoons. Radivojevich's division had three brigades under General-majors Ignaz Csivich von Rohr, Matthias Rebrovich, and Laval Nugent von Westmeath. Csivich commanded two Grenz and two line battalions, Rebrovich led one Grenz and two line battalions, and Nugent supervised four squadrons of hussars.

== Operations ==
On 12 August 1813, the Austrian Empire declared war on Imperial France, putting the Illyrian Provinces and the Kingdom of Italy on the front lines. Hiller sent Radivojevich and 10,000 troops of his left wing to capture first Karlovac (Karlstadt) and Novo Mesto (Rudolfswerth), and later Rijeka (Fiume) and Trieste. Meanwhile, Hiller led the remainder of the army in a thrust across the Drava River at Villach. By the beginning of August, Eugène had advanced into Illyria with 47,000 troops and set up his headquarters in Ljubljana (Laibach). The Franco-Italian army defended an arc from Tarvisio (Tarvis) in the north to Ljubljana in the center to Karlovac in the south.

When the French first gained control of Illyria, many Croats hoped that the new masters would spur economic expansion and lighten their military obligations. Over time, their hopes were not realized and when Radivojevich's columns crossed the frontier, the Croats rose in rebellion against the French occupation. Though the Hofkriegsrat (Austrian high command) did not wish to promote nationalism, they ultimately sent 12,000 muskets with Radivojevich to arm the insurgents. The Croatian revolt helped the Austrian left wing capture territory. Mass desertions also became a severe problem in the Illyrian units of Eugène's army.

Hiller's troops started to advance into Illyria on 16 August 1813. Radivojevich enjoyed early success, taking Karlovac and Novo Mesto with little resistance. On 20 August, Frimont and over 6,000 Austrians appeared before Villach, initiating a week-long series of skirmishes. Frimont seized Villach's east bank suburb on the 21st. Three days later, a 3,000-strong French brigade under General of Brigade Jean-Pierre Piat tried to rush the bridge at Villach and was bloodily repulsed with 604 casualties. The Austrians only lost 251 men in the clash. On 28 August, General of Division Pierre Guillaume Gratien attacked Villach with an entire division. Though three Austrian divisions were in the area, Gratien managed to eject his foes from the town and drive them back to the east bank of the Drava. Gratien's 10,000-man 3rd Division suffered 112 casualties while inflicting 167 on the Austrians. In the struggle, four-fifths of Villach burned down and three arches of the bridge were destroyed.

== Battle ==
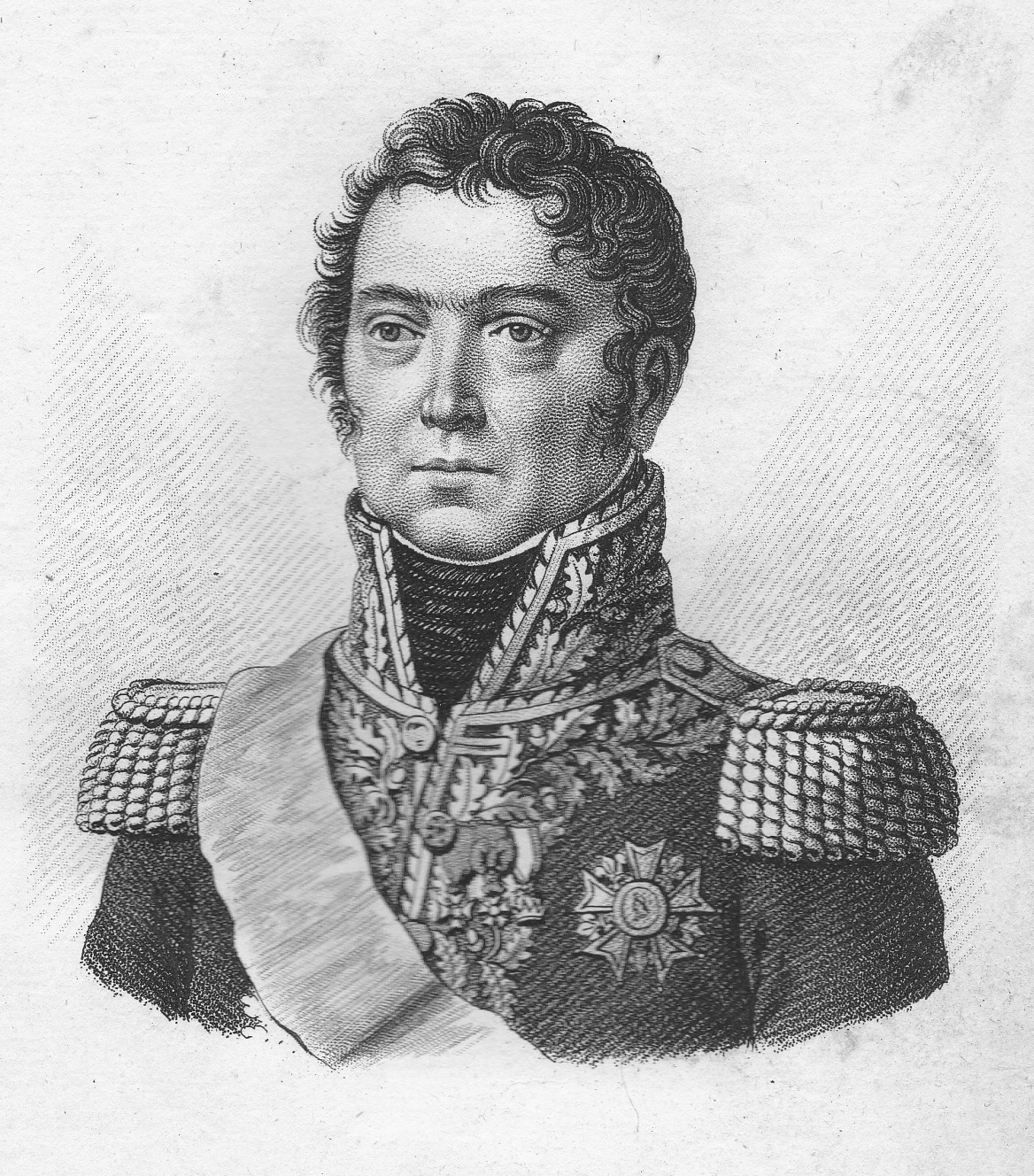
Paul Grenier

Thwarted at Villach, Hiller sought to create a bridgehead farther east on the Drava. He found a crossing point south of Klagenfurt and pushed troops across the river at Feistritz im Rosental around the end of August. Eugène felt that the Austrian position menaced the communications between his right and his left wings. He ordered one of his corps commanders, General of Division Paul Grenier to take two divisions and eliminate the Austrian bridgehead. Grenier marched with Generals of Division François Jean Baptiste Quesnel and Marie François Rouyer, leaving Gratien to hold Tarvisio. The Italian Guard moved from Tarvisio to Jesenice (Assling) while the 4th Division under General of Division Pierre-Louis Binet de Marcognet held a position at Bistrica (Neumarkt).

Hiller was aware of recent French probes in the Feistritz area so he sent two battalions of grenadiers to nearby Schloss Hollenburg on the morning of 6 September 1813. A line battalion was sent to Weizelsdorf to act as a reserve. Vécsey entrenched his brigade along the Bärenthal ravine with his right flank on the Drava and his left on steep forested hills to the south. The Austrians were supported by eight artillery pieces. Two cannons and a howitzer were on the opposite bank of the river at Ludmannsdorf in a position to enfilade any attack. Vécsey's 3,300-man brigade. It is not clear if all the reinforcing grenadiers are included in the total, since the author listed only the Chimani Battalion. consisted of 10 companies of the Reisky Infantry Regiment Nr. 10, the 1st and Landwehr Battalions of the Chasteler Infantry Regiment Nr. 27, the 9th Jäger Battalion, and four squadrons of the Merveldt Uhlan Regiment Nr. 1. The grenadier reserve at Hollenburg included the Chimani and Welsperg Grenadier Battalions. Vécsey posted his main line behind the Bärenthal ravine on the east side, but he established strong positions on the west side at Feistritz Castle, Holy Cross Cemetery, and the hamlets of Mittel- and Ober-Feistritz. The bridge over the ravine was blocked by a barricade.

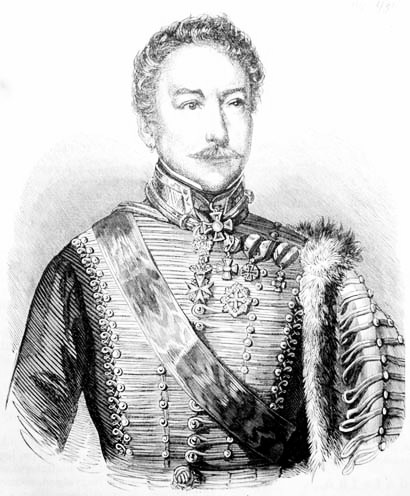
August von Vécsey

Grenier had 15,186 soldiers and 28 guns available, with 7,700 men in Quesnel's 1st Division and 7,486 troops in Rouyer's 2nd Division. An unspecified number of cannons were also attached as regimental artillery. Quesnel had two brigades under Generals of Brigade Jean Gaudens Claude Pegot and Toussaint Campi plus one eight-gun foot and one six-gun horse artillery batteries. Rouyer led two brigades under Generals of Brigade Nicolas Schmitz and Jacques Darnaud with one eight-gun foot and one six-gun horse artillery batteries. Pegot's brigade comprised four battalions of the 84th Line Infantry Regiment. Campi's brigade consisted of four battalions each of the 92nd Line Infantry Regiment and the 30th Provisional Demi-Brigade. Schmitz commanded four battalions of the 9th Line Infantry Regiment and three battalions of the 28th Provisional Demi-Brigade. Darnaud's brigade was made up of four battalions of the 35th Line Infantry Regiment.

On the morning of 6 September, Grenier's troops started their march from Sankt Jakob im Rosental in three columns. The right column left the bivouac first under the command of Campi. The column consisted of Campi's brigade with the 84th Line's regimental guns attached. Quesnel led the center column which set out after the right column cleared Sankt Jakob. This force was formed from Pegot's brigade, the Italian Queen's Dragoon Regiment, one battery of horse artillery, and a half-battery of foot artillery. The left column left the camp last, about 9:00 AM. Schmitz led the column which was made up of his own brigade. When the right column reached the hamlet of Matschach, Campi dropped off a battalion and two cannons as a flank guard. The right column then moved into the hills overlooking Feistritz, leaving a second battalion behind as a reserve. As the center column crossed the Klein Dürrenbach ravine about 2.0 miles (3.2 km) west of Feistritz, it chased away some Austrian skirmishers and detached a battalion of the 84th Line to observe enemy movements on the north bank of the Drava. Quesnel's column reached the hamlet of Suetschach and took cover until called upon to attack. When the left column came up, Schmitz relieved the 84th Line battalion with one of his own.

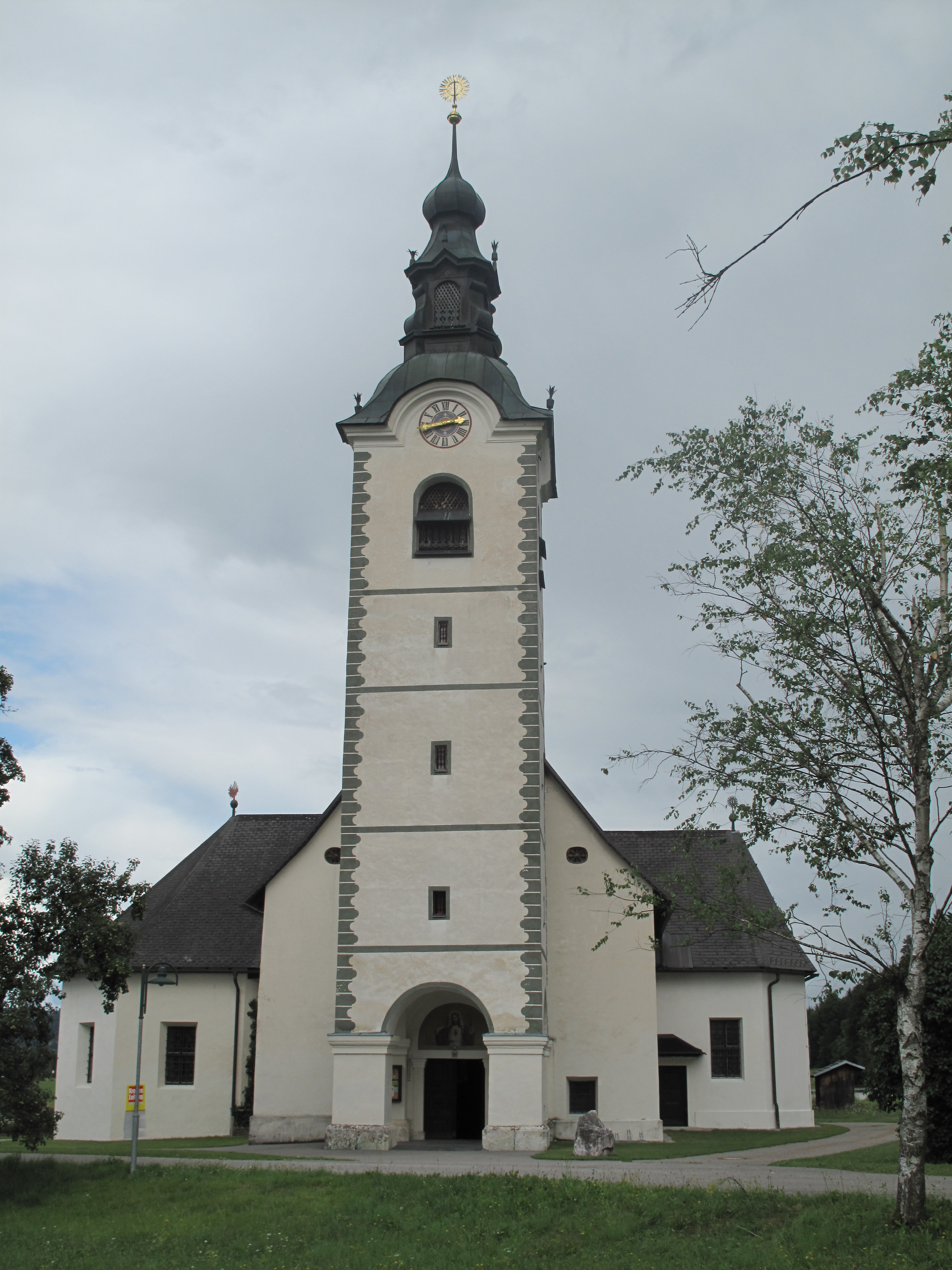
Church in Sankt Johann im Rosental which saw fighting

Grenier instructed Quesnel to form the center column in two lines with skirmishers out in front. His objective was to get soldiers onto the east side of the Bärenthal ravine. Schmitz, who fought under the eye of his division commander Rouyer, was also ordered to form his men into two lines. He was to clear Mittel- and Ober-Feistritz of enemies so that the French soldiers could fire on the Austrian soldiers on the east side of the ravine. Off to the right, Campi already had instructions to assist the attacks of the center and left columns as well as to attack the Austrians from the rear. From Jesenice in the upper Sava valley, Eugène directed two battalions of the Italian Guard to move north and clear away any Austrian outposts to the south of Feistritz.

Skirmishing between the two sides began around 10:00 AM and became general by noon. The main assault began at 3:00 PM when Campi came down on the Austrian left flank while Quesnel and Schmitz attacked in front. Seeing his left turned, Vécsey sent a message to Hollenburg asking for assistance. The French scored an early coup when they captured a group of Austrians as they were withdrawing toward the castle. A battalion of the 84th Line became heavily engaged and it was supported by the 28th Provisional. The assault focused on the church, the cemetery, and a redoubt on the west side of the ravine. A battalion of the 28th Provisional rushed the redoubt and slaughtered its defenders. Meanwhile, the 9th Line threatened the church and Mittel-Feistritz. When units of the 9th Jägers saw the redoubt fall and French soldiers get into the ravine, they retreated from the Holy Cross Church and Cemetery into the Feistritz Castle. Schmitz led a force from the 9th Line in a charge against the castle, while the 84th supported him. But the attack stalled as the troops clawed their way through abatis under heavy musketry.

After his men were beaten back several times, Schmitz ordered the castle set on fire. As soon as the structure took fire, the 116 defenders surrendered. At this time, the 84th Line rushed the bridge, which was defended by elements of the Reisky and Chasteler Regiments. When the 84th carried the position, Vécsey's men abandoned their positions and began to retreat. After a voltigeur company of the 9th Line crossed the Bärenthal ravine, they were charged by a squadron of uhlans, but they managed to drive off the horsemen. As units of the 9th Line and 28th Provisional moved through the abandoned Austrian camps, they were backed by four platoons of the 84th Line arrayed in close order. By about 5:30 PM, amid heavy rain, the entire Feistritz position was in French hands. When the pursuit reached Hundsdorf, Vécsey counterattacked. Momentarily stopped, the French units soon closed up and pushed their foes back to Sankt Johann im Rosental. At this place, the Austrians fought back against one of Campi's battalions which had come down from the heights. At some point during the late afternoon, the two grenadier battalions arrived and covered the retreat. At 8:00 PM, the grenadiers repulsed one last attempt by Campi to cut off Vécsey's withdrawal. That evening Vécsey retreated to the north bank of the Drava at Hollenburg and destroyed the bridge.

== Aftermath ==
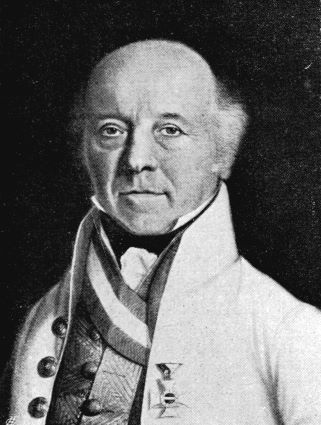
Johann von Hiller

The French suffered 60 killed and 300 wounded, including 12 officers of the 84th Line. Chef de bataillon (Major) Charrier of the 9th Line was killed. Their opponents admitted losses of 67 killed, 364 wounded, and 394 captured. In addition, the two grenadier battalions lost 88 casualties. Eugène reported that most of the prisoners came from the Reisky, Chasteler, Chimani, and Merveldt units. Though Hiller was aware of the significance of his bridgehead, he failed to properly support Vécsey's brigade by placing the nearest reinforcements a six-hour march distant. With Feistritz in his possession, Eugène had the use of the Loibl Pass to communicate between Tarvisio and Ljubljana. He hoped to mount an attack on Hiller's left flank brigade at Kamnik (Stein).

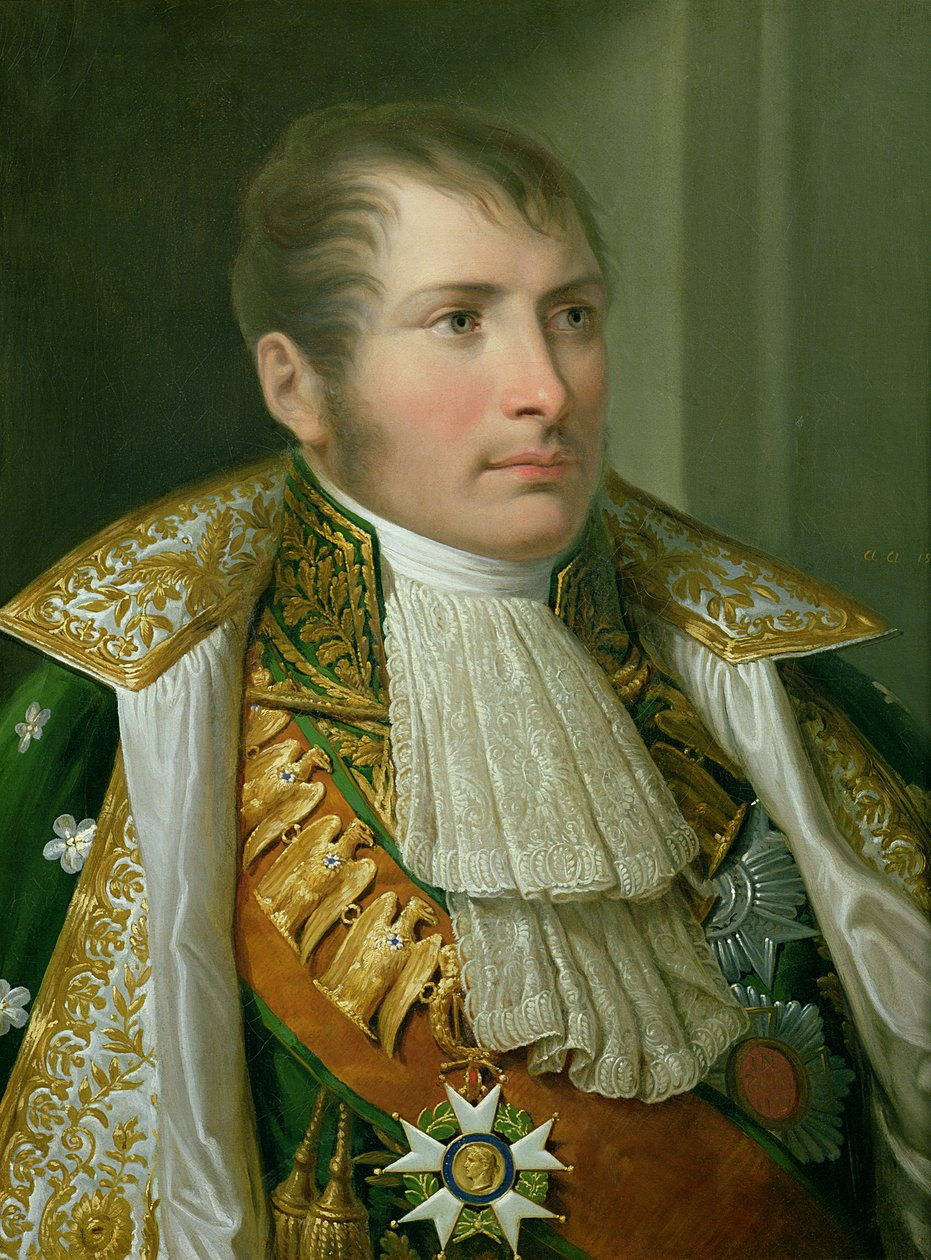
Eugene de Beauharnais

Eugène failed to capitalize on his momentary advantage because his forces suffered a series of setbacks. On 7 September 1813, a 2,563-man brigade belonging to General of Division Giuseppe Federico Palombini's 5th Division was defeated by Nugent and 2,100 Austrians at Lippa. The Italians lost 104 killed and 200 captured while Austrian losses were light. The next day near Trzin, General of Brigade Gaspare Bellotti's 3,600-man brigade was ambushed by General-major Joseph von Fölseis and 2,000 Austrians. The Italian 3rd Line Infantry Regiment was routed, losing 60 killed, 200 wounded, 600 prisoners, two colors, two guns, and three caissons. The prisoners included Bellotti and the colonel of the regiment. Austrian losses were only five killed, 14 wounded, and five missing.

On 11 September 1813, Austrians in Feldmarschall-Leutnant Franz Maria Philipp Fenner's command mounted a successful raid at Mühlbach in the South Tyrol, capturing 100 soldiers and provoking a deep withdrawal by General of Division Filippo Bonfanti who was then replaced. On the same day, 130 Austrians and one Royal Navy brig captured the port of Pula (Pola). On the 13th at Šmarje–Sap (St. Marein-Sap), Eugène personally led 3,300 men and six guns of the Italian Guard against Oberst Eugen Milutinovich's 1,000 Austrians and two artillery pieces. Attacking a strong position, the Italian Guard suffered a repulse, losing 300 killed and wounded plus 97 captured. Austrian losses numbered only 47 killed and wounded plus 28 captured.

General of Division Domenico Pino concentrated 9,000 troops against Nugent's 2,000 men at Jelšane on 14 September. The Austrians held on until dark before retreating and inflicted 420 casualties on their attackers while only losing 24 killed, 88 wounded, and three artillery pieces damaged. This was followed by another minor disaster at Višnja Gora (Weichselburg) when General-major Matthias Rebrovich attacked General of Brigade Teodoro Lechi on 16 September. The Radetzsky Hussars Nr. 5 rode down a battalion of the Italian Guard, capturing 910 men out of the 2,900 present and seizing two out of five cannons. Austrian losses were only 16 killed, 68 wounded, and 27 captured out of 3,200 men.

Two other events compelled Eugène to relinquish his hold on Illyria. Fenner's column thrust to the west into the Tyrol, menacing the viceroy's strategic left flank. More consequential, in the opinion of historian Frederick C. Schneid, was the possibility of the Kingdom of Bavaria abandoning its alliance with Napoleon. Eugène's wife was Princess Augusta of Bavaria and King Maximilian I Joseph of Bavaria was his father-in-law. The king desired to remain a French ally, but the viceroy became aware that the king was under pressure to defect to the Coalition. At the end of September, Eugene complained to his step-father Napoleon that desertion in Italian and French units was becoming a serious problem. By 5 October 1813, the Franco-Italian army withdrew to the Isonzo River on the border of Italy.
