= Paul von Radivojevich =

Austrian army corps commander (1759–1829)

- Born: 1759; Szentendre, Kingdom of Hungary
- Died: 15 July 1829 (aged 69–70) Verona, Lombardy-Venetia, Austrian Empire
- Allegiance: Austrian Empire
- Branch: Infantry
- Rank: Feldzeugmeister
- Conflicts: French Revolutionary Wars; First Battle of Wissembourg; Napoleonic Wars; Battle of Dürrenstein; Battle of Austerlitz; Battle of Eckmühl; Battle of Gefrees; Battle of Cerknica; Battle of Caldiero; Battle of the Mincio River; Hundred Days
- Awards: Order of Leopold, CC 1813; Order of St Anna, 1st class, 1815; Order of Saints Maurice and Lazarus, GC
- Other work: Inhaber Infantry Regiment Nr. 48; Privy Councillor, 1816

Paul von Radivojevich (1759 – 15 July 1829) was an Austrian army corps commander in the army of the Austrian Empire during the late Napoleonic Wars. He joined the army of the Habsburg monarchy in 1782 and fought in one of the early battles of the French Revolutionary Wars. He led a Grenz Infantry Regiment before being promoted to general officer in 1807. He led a brigade at Eckmühl in 1809, a division in the summer of 1813, and a corps at Caldiero in 1813 and at the Mincio in 1814. During the 1815 Italian campaign, he led a corps in Switzerland, Piedmont, and France. After the wars, he commanded part of the Military Frontier. He was Proprietor (Inhaber) of an infantry regiment from 1815 until his death in 1829.

== Birth to 1809 ==
Radivojevich was born into a family of Serbian descent in Szentendre near Budapest in the Kingdom of Hungary, which was part of the Habsburg monarchy at the time. In 1782, he joined the Austrian army as an officer cadet in the Peterwardeiner Grenz Infantry Regiment Nr. 9. He fought against the French at the First Battle of Wissembourg in 1793. He became Oberst (colonel) of the Broder Grenz Infantry Regiment Nr. 7 and served with distinction during the War of the Third Coalition in 1805. The Broder Regiment fought at the Battle of Dürrenstein on 11 November 1805 and at the Battle of Austerlitz on 2 December.

Promoted General-major on 2 April 1807, he found himself commanding a brigade in Hannibal Sommariva's division of Franz Seraph of Orsini-Rosenberg's IV Corps in the War of the Fifth Coalition. At the Battle of Eckmühl on 22 April 1809 he led his troops which included two battalions of the Walachisch-Illyrian Grenz Infantry Regiment Nr. 13, eight squadrons of the Stipsicz Hussar Regiment Nr. 10, and a six gun cavalry battery with 6-pound guns. He led troops under the overall command of Michael von Kienmayer in an Austrian victory at the Battle of Gefrees on 8 July 1809.

== 1809 to 1814 ==
Radivojevich was promoted to Feldmarschall-Leutnant on 25 August 1809. From 1810 to 1811 he was acting commander of the Banat district of the Military Frontier. He became the Second Inhaber of Infantry Regiment Nr. 14 in 1811. During 1812 he directed the Observation Corps in Transylvania. In August 1813, he commanded a division in Johann von Hiller's Army of Inner Austria. Radivojevich directed three brigades under Ignaz Csivich von Rohr, Matthias Rebrovich, and Laval Nugent von Westmeath. Csivich led one battalion each of the Archduke Franz Karl Infantry Regiment Nr. 52, Warasdeiner-Kreutzer Grenz Nr. 5 and St. Georger Grenz Nr. 6. Rebrovich supervised one battalion of the Gradiscaner Grenz Nr. 8 and two battalions of the Archduke Franz Karl Nr. 52. Nugent led four squadrons of the Radetzky Hussar Regiment Nr. 5.

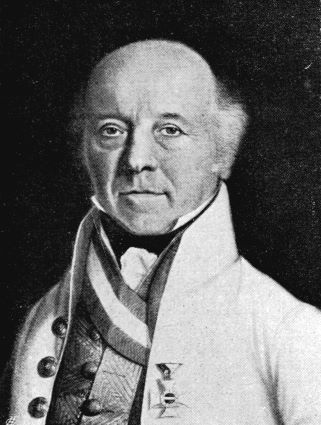
Johann von Hiller

Radivojevich's 10,000 troops were ordered to invade the Illyrian Provinces in the south while Hiller attacked in the north. Radivojevich brought 12,000 muskets with his columns to arm the Croats who were irritated with the French occupation. As his columns advanced in mid-August 1813, the Croat and Serb population rose in revolt, facilitating the success of the Austrian army. His troops quickly captured Karlovac (Karlstadt) and Novo Mesto (Neustadt). While Hiller suffered defeats at Villach in late August and in the Battle of Feistritz on 6 September, Radivojevich's columns scored a series of successes. Nugent's task force drubbed an Italian force at Lipa on 7 September 1813. Though Nugent sustained a minor setback at Jelšane on 14 September, Rebrovich won an engagement with an Italian force at Višnja Gora on the 16th. At Cerknica on 27 September 1813, Radivojevich himself led 4,000 Austrians and nine guns in a victory over the 5,000 men and seven guns of Giuseppe Federico Palombini's 5th Italian Division. Csivich's brigade was engaged, as was Rebrovich's Gradiscaner Grenz Nr. 8 battalion and Nugent's hussars. Palombini's force included nine Italian battalions and two Illyrian battalions. Casualties are unknown except that 300 Italians were captured. By 5 October, the Franco-Italian army of Eugène de Beauharnais abandoned Illyria and fell back to the Isonzo River.

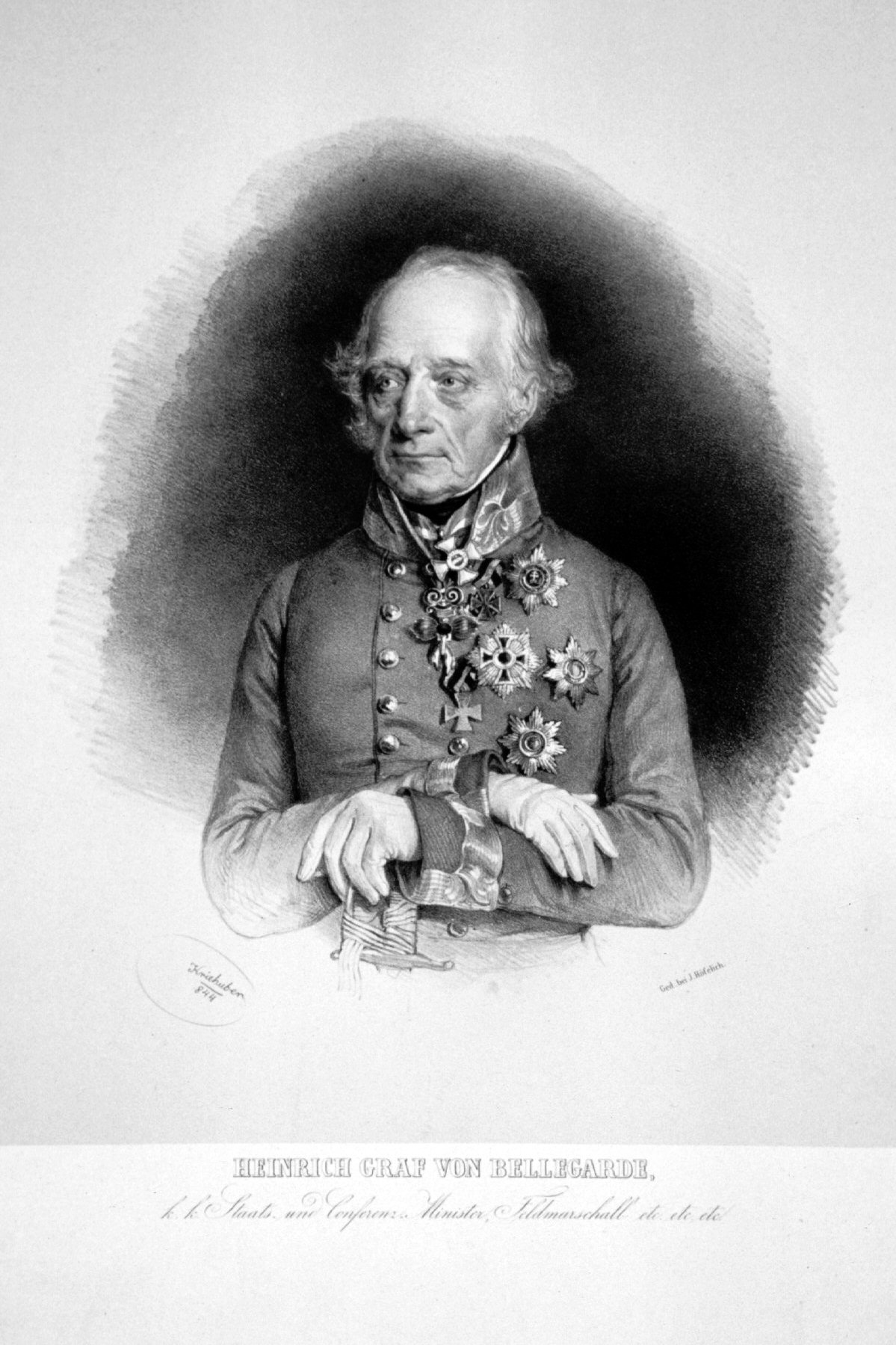
Heinrich von Bellegarde

In October 1813, Radivojevich was appointed commander of the Left Wing Corps, which he would lead until the end of the 1814 campaign. The advance guard of his corps reached Gradisca on 6 October 1813. After hearing that the Kingdom of Bavaria defected to the Coalition on 8 October, Eugène began retreating to the Adige River on the 16th. Hoping to cut Eugène off from Verona, Hiller ordered Radivojevich to apply frontal pressure on the Franco-Italians while he sent three brigades to turn Eugène's left flank in the Tyrol. Rebrovich's advance guard of the Left Wing Corps crossed the Isonzo on 24 October and scouted in the direction of Palmanova which was garrisoned by 4,000 Franco-Italians. At first, Rebrovich pushed hard on Eugène's rear-guards but later slackened his pace when Radivojevich was instructed to distract Eugène while avoiding a major battle. At the Battle of Bassano (1813) on 31 October, the Franco-Italians pushed one of Hiller's flanking columns out of the way. Covered by effective rearguard actions against Radivojevich's oncoming columns, Eugène's army got safely back to the Adige in the first week of November.

Because Radivojevich was forced to detach troops to mask the fortresses of Venice, Palmanova, and Osoppo, his weakened corps was unable to seriously threaten the Adige line. Even so, historian Frederick C. Schneid considered Radivojevich's movements "lethargic". Meanwhile, Trieste surrendered to Nugent on 28 October after a 16-day siege. When Hiller probed the Adige line near Verona, Eugène reacted by launching a counterattack. At 10:00 AM on 15 November, several Franco-Italian divisions assaulted the Austrian positions in the Battle of Caldiero. The Austrians were worsted, losing 1,500 killed and wounded plus 900 men and two cannons captured. The Franco-Italians lost only 500 killed and wounded out of a total of 16,000. Radivojevich was in tactical control of 8,000 soldiers in 10 battalions, 11 squadrons, and nine artillery pieces. In the action, he directed one division led by Franz Mauroy de Merville and three brigades under Anton Gundaker von Starhemberg, Ludwig von Eckhardt, and August von Vécsey.

Unhappy with Hiller's inability to chase Eugène out of Italy, the Hofkriegsrat replaced him with Count Heinrich von Bellegarde. When Joachim Murat defected to the Coalition in January 1814, bringing the army of the Kingdom of Naples with him, Eugène abandoned the line of the Adige and fell back to the Mincio River. Hoping to secure a bridgehead across the Mincio, Bellegarde put his army in motion. On the same day, Eugène determined to drive back the Austrian outposts. These actions brought about the Battle of the Mincio River on 8 February 1814. The Franco-Italians won the battle while losing 3,000 killed and wounded and 500 captured out of 34,000 troops engaged. The Austrians suffered losses of 2,800 killed and wounded plus 1,200 men captured. Accompanied by Bellegarde, Radivojevich's right-wing got across the Mincio at Borghetto near Valeggio and began to drive back Eugène's weak left wing under Jean-Antoine Verdier. Meanwhile, Eugène made his main effort on the right with Paul Grenier's reinforced corps. He and Grenier crossed the river and began rolling up the Austrian left wing after heavy fighting near Pozzolo. Though outnumbered three-to-one, Verdier's men proved unexpectedly tenacious and held out most of the day. When Eugène and Grenier approached Valeggio from the south, threatening to cut them off from the east bank, Bellegarde and Radivojevich hastily withdrew their soldiers and conceded defeat. Undaunted, they tried to force a crossing two days later but were repulsed again. Discouraged, Bellegarde never again tried to break the Mincio line during the campaign.

== 1815 and later ==
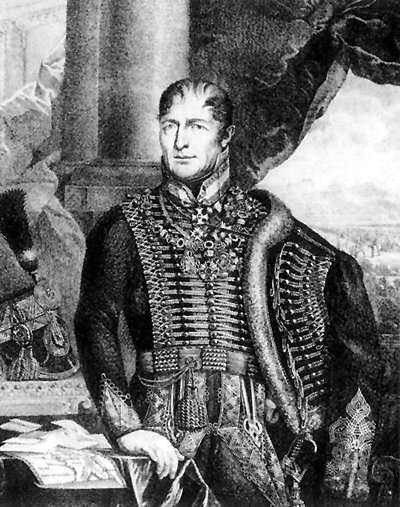
Johann Frimont

During the Hundred Days when Napoleon returned from exile, Marshal Louis Gabriel Suchet was appointed to defend the border of France from Switzerland to the Mediterranean Sea. The Corps of Observation of the Alps counted 23,000 infantry, 900 cavalry, and 28 cannons. Of these, only 8,600 infantry were regulars while the remainder were from the National Guard. The Austrian army in Piedmont numbered 48,000 mostly veteran troops under Johann Maria Philipp Frimont. His I Corps was led by Radivojevich, while Ferdinand, Graf Bubna von Littitz directed the II Corps and Merville commanded the Reserve. In addition, there were 12,000 rather shaky Piedmontese soldiers. The I Corps consisted of the Light Division under Louis Charles Folliot de Crenneville and the 1st Division with no commander but with two brigades under Joseph von Fölseis and Philipp Pflüger von Lindenfels. Quenneville led three Grenz infantry and two Jäger battalions, eight squadrons of Chevau-légers, and a light battery. The other two brigades each had one artillery battery and six battalions split evenly between two line infantry regiments.

Frimont sent Bubna and the Piedmontese army west through the Mount Cenis Pass confront Suchet. Meanwhile, he and Radivojevich moved north through the Simplon Pass into Switzerland to reach Geneva and turning the French northern flank. Intent on seizing the mountain passes, Suchet moved into Savoy on 14 June 1815. After capturing or chasing away the 3,000 Piedmontese defenders, the French began to encounter Austrian troops. Soon Austrian numerical superiority made itself felt. Both Radivojevich and Bubna were pressing back the French when news of Napoleon's abdication arrived to end the fighting. After negotiating an armistice, Suchet's forces withdrew from Savoy. But the Austrians kept advancing, taking both Grenoble and Lyon before the war officially ended.

After the fighting ended, Radivojevich took command of the Reserve Corps of the Army of Italy from July until October 1815, when he was briefly the acting army commander. He was appointed Inhaber of the Radivojevich Infantry Regiment Nr. 48 in November 1815. A court-martial convicted the previous Inhaber Joseph Anton von Simbschen of abuse of office on 12 July 1815. The Hofkriegsrat then overturned the mild verdict, sentenced Simbschen to a harsher penalty, and stripped him of the title of Inhaber. Radivojevich received a Russian medal, the Order of St. Anna 1st Class in 1815 and a Piedmontese award, the Order of Saints Maurice and Lazarus at an unknown date. He became an Imperial Privy Councillor on 2 December 1816. He was appointed to command the Warasdin-Karlstadt district of the Military Frontier in February 1823. He received the noble rank of Freiherr on 13 April 1826. On 18 February 1829, the old veteran assumed the rank of Feldzeugmeister. He was deputy commander of Lombardy-Venetia from March 1829 until his death on 15 July 1829 at Verona. Alois Gollner von Goldenfels became the new Inhaber of Infantry Regiment Nr. 48.

== Notes ==
Military offices
Preceded by Joseph Anton von Simbschen	Proprietor (Inhaber) of Infantry Regiment Nr. 48; 1815–1829	Succeeded by Alois Gollner von Goldenfels
