= Battle of the Mincio River =

The Battle of the Mincio River may refer to two battles on the Mincio River in northern Italy, both between a French army and an Austrian army commanded by Heinrich Graf von Bellegarde during the Napoleonic Wars:

- Battle of the Mincio River (1800) (also known as the Battle of Pozzolo), which occurred during the War of the Second Coalition
- Battle of the Mincio River (1814), which occurred during the War of the Sixth Coalition
