= Battle of Caldiero =

The Battle of Caldiero may refer to:

- Battle of Caldiero (1796), a defeat of the French First Republic forces under Napoleon Bonaparte by a Habsburg corps
- Battle of Caldiero (1805), a battle between André Masséna's French and Archduke Charles, Duke of Teschen's Austrians
- Battle of Caldiero (1809), a clash between the Austrian forces of Archduke John of Austria and Eugène de Beauharnais' French army
- Battle of Caldiero (1813), a battle between Johann von Hiller's Austrian army and Eugène de Beauharnais's French army
