= Battle of Šmarje–Sap =

1813 battle

- Part of the Illyrian Campaign of 1813
Date	13 September 1813
Location	Šmarje–Sap, Illyrian Provinces, French Empire
Result	Austrian victory

Belligerents
(France) French Empire (Kingdom of Italy (Napoleonic)) Kingdom of Italy	Austrian Empire

Commanders and leaders
(Kingdom of Italy (Napoleonic)) Eugène de Beauharnais	(Austrian Empire) Eugen Milutinovich

Strength
3,300 men	1,000 men 2 guns

Casualties and losses
300 killed and wounded 97 captured	47 killed and wounded 28 captured

The Battle of Šmarje-Sap was an engagement which took place on 13 September 1813 in the French Illyrian provinces between the Napoleonic Italian and Austrian forces.

== Battle ==
After the lost Battle of Lippa and several rumors Italian viceroy Eugene had to change plans and ordered an attack from Ljubljana on the Austrian position near Šmarje–Sap for September 13. However, the outnumbered Austrians were in a strong position and managed to uphold all Italian attacks and repulsing them.

== Sources ==
- Smith, Digby (1998). The Napoleonic Wars Data Book. London: Greenhill. ISBN 1-85367-276-9.
