= 84th Infantry Regiment (France) =

Infantry unit of the French Army

- 84e régiment d'infanterie
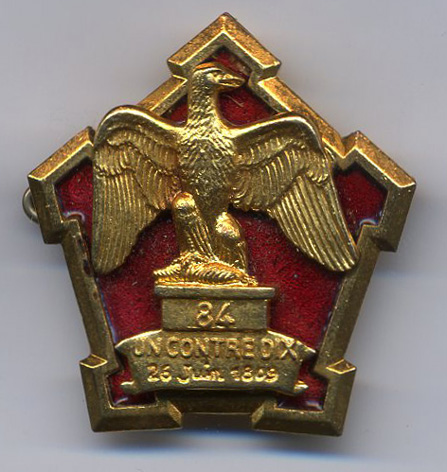
- insignia
- Active: 1684 - Present
- Country: France
- Type: Infantry
- Garrison/HQ: Avesnes-sur-Helpe
- Motto: L'incomparable ou Un contre dix
- Engagements: Napoleonic Wars: Battle of Ulm; Battle of Austerlitz; Battle of Graz; Battle of Smolensk; Battle of Borodino; Battle of Maloyaroslavets; Battle of Feistritz; Battle of Caldiero; The Battle of Waterloo; World War I World War II: Battle of France

Flag of the regiment

The 84th Line Infantry Regiment is an infantry unit of the French Army. It was heir of the Quercy Regiment and the 9th Light Regiment, created in 1684. It fought in the Battle of France in 1940.

In December 1795 the 84e demi-brigade was created from the 36e and 116e demi-brigades as well as a battalion of Orleans volunteers. It fought in Switzerland and Germany and with distinction at the Battle of Höchstädt (1800).The third battalion was sent to Santo Domingo and later became part of the 82e ligne, the first two battalions as well as the third battalion of the 89e demi-brigade became part of the new 84e ligne.

In 1805 it was part of Marmont's II Corps and fought at the battles of Ulm and Austerlitz. After Austerlitz, Marmont's corps was sent to Illyria (now Croatia) and served as the garrison there until 1809. In 1809 the regiment was transferred to Prince Eugene's Army of Italy and took part in the defeat at Sacile and the victory on the Piave but gained everlasting fame for its actions at the Battle of Graz on the 25th of June. Two battalions of the 84e under Colonel Gambin were dispatched to take the town and drive off the enemy who were believed to be few in number. The action began at night and Gambin's men soon found that there were more than just a few Austrians in Graz. They first took the church and 400 Croatian prisoners, who they locked in the church. They threw back a series of disjointed counterattacks by the Croatian Insurrection ([Landwehr]) and Austrian regulars but began to run out of ammunition and had to take rounds from the dead Austrians. At 3 pm a much more serious attack took place and the 84e almost lost its eagle standard, and lost its battalion guns. After 17 hours of fighting against a far superior force, the situation was desperate but the rest of Boussier's Division arrived just in the nick of time saving them.

It was on the battlefield of Wagram that Gambin presented the Emperor with the flags taken at Graz: "Colonel," said Napoleon, "I am pleased with the bravery of your regiment and yours, you will have your eagles engraved: ONE AGAINST TEN. The 84th regiment also received 96 decorations of the Legion of Honor and an imperial decree of August 15 conferred on the colonel the title of count, with an endowment of 10,000 francs of annuity.

In 1812 it was part of the IV Corps in Russia and fought at the Battle of Smolensk (1812), Battle of Borodino, and the Battle of Maloyaroslavets, where it again fought with great distinction as the town changed hands eight times and General Alexis Delzons was killed leading the regiment during the battle. Reformed in 1813 it again served in Italy at the Battle of Feistritz, and the Battle of Caldiero. In 1815 two battalions fought at The Battle of Waterloo as part of the VI Corps, taking part in the Battle for Plancenoit.

== World War II ==
It was reformed on August 23, 1939 as the 84th Fortress Infantry Regiment (RIF). A Type A reserve regiment, it was set up by the infantry mobilization center 13 of Metz-Lauter. It belongs to the 101st Fortress Infantry Division and covers the Thiérache sector of the fortified sector (SF) de Maubeuge, that is to say from Maubeuge to Trélon. It liaised with the 4th North African Infantry Division (4th DINA). It was the first to suffer the German assault from the 7th Panzer Division which broke through to Clairfayts before retreating with the remains of the 87th Fortress Infantry Regiment in the SF Escaut. From May 25 to 30, 1940, it fought in the Lille Pocket. Part of the regiment embarked for England during the Battle of Dunkirk then returned to the battlefield in Normandy.
