= Károly Vécsey =

Hungarian general and revolutionary

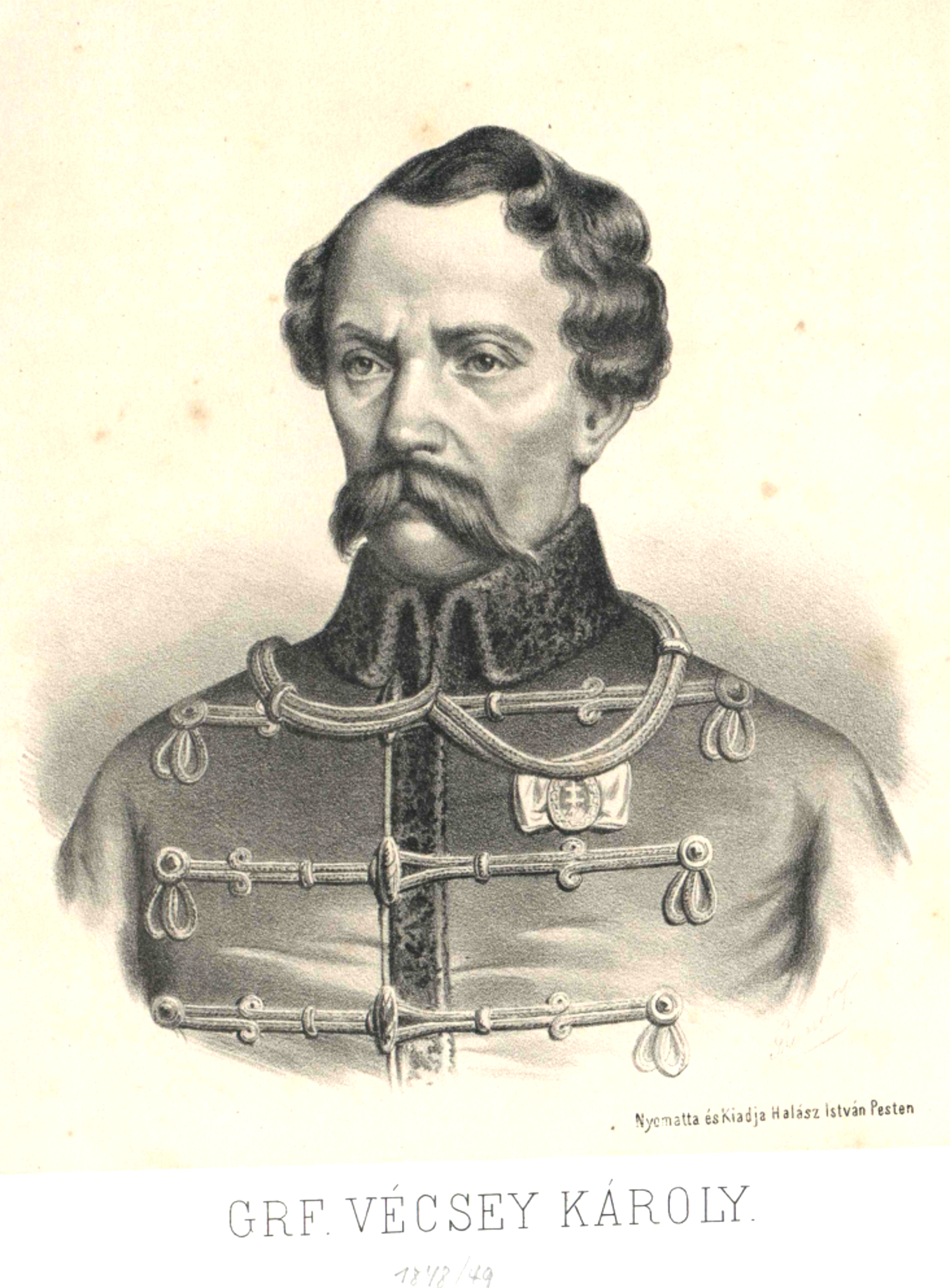
Károly Vécsey

Count Károly Vécsey de Hernádvécse et Hajnácskő (24 November 1803 – 6 October 1849) was a Honvéd general in the Hungarian Army. He was executed for his role in the Hungarian Revolution of 1848 and is regarded as one of the 13 Martyrs of Arad.

== Ancestry ==
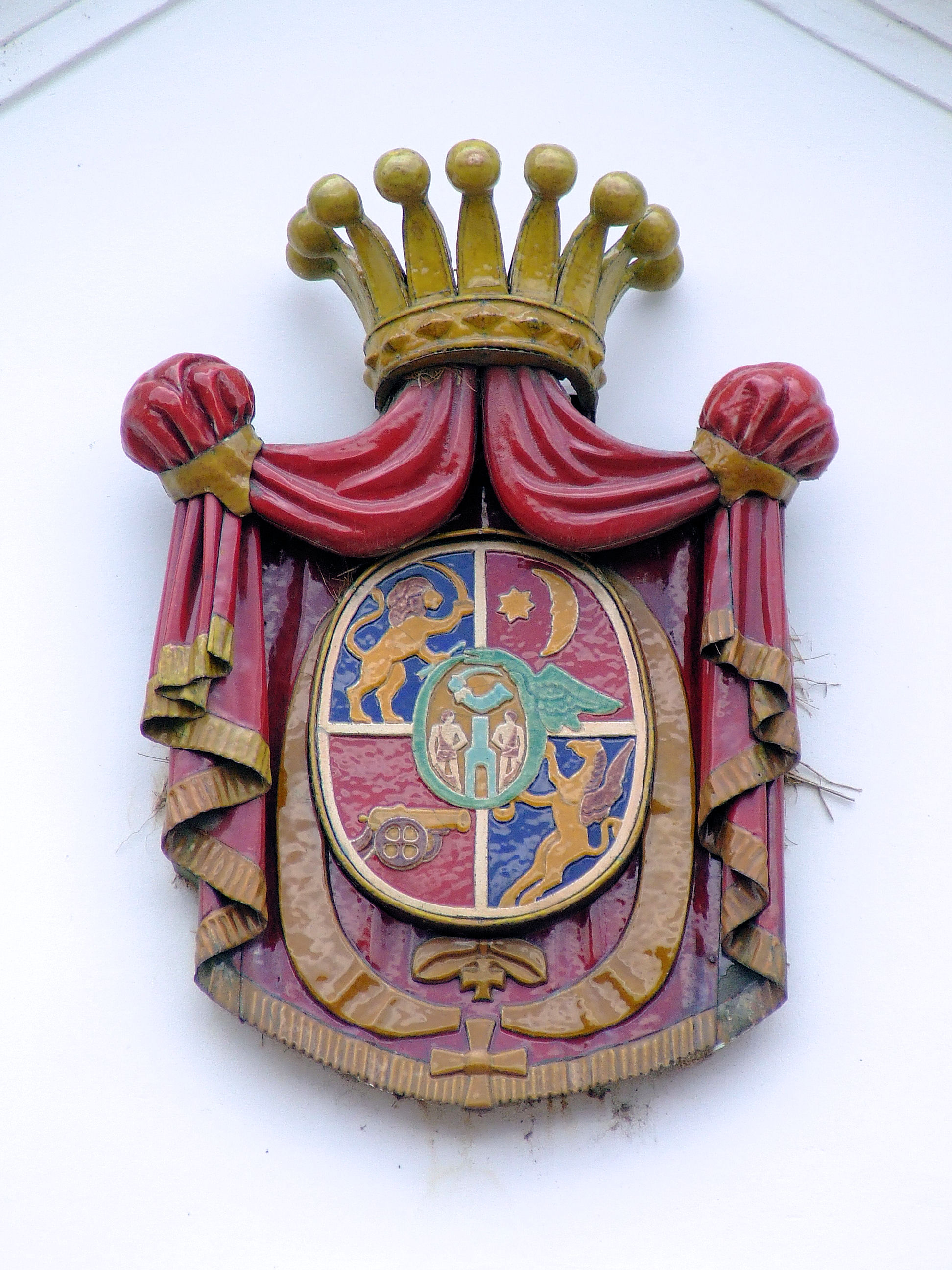
Vécsey family coat of arms

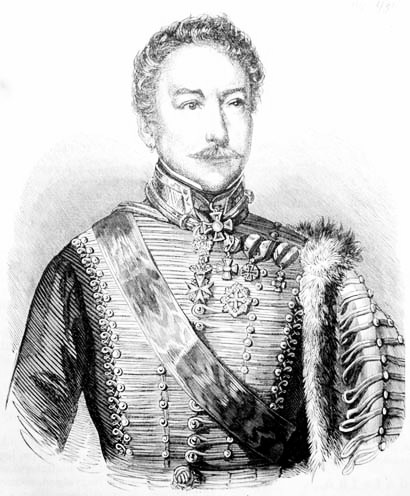
His father, General August von Vécsey

The Vécsey family originated from Ugocsa and Abaúj counties, tracing its ancestry back to the 15th century. The family adopted the name of the village of its first known ancestors in Hernádvécse, Abaúj. Balázs Szőllősi de Vécse was born in 1470. The family's wealth grew significantly when Sándor Vécsey married Mária Csápy de Polyánka around 1517, whose family had ties to the Hungarian royal lineage. On 21 November 1692, Lipót László Vécsey married and established two branches of the family: the Gömör and Várad branches, which lasted into the 19th century. During this time, the family flourished and established a long tradition of military service.

Along the Gömör line, Siegbert Vécsey, Károly's grandfather, was born in 1789. He was eventually appointed to the Military Order of Maria Theresa and became a lieutenant-general in the Imperial army. His son, Count August von Vécsey was a cavalry commander, also admitted to the Order of Maria Theresa, and was the last commander of the Viennese Hungarian Noble Guard before it was disbanded. His wife, Amalia Colson, Károly Vécsey's mother, died in 1826. From this marriage, the following children were born:

- Mária (1805–1875)
- Károly
- Angelika (1808–1885)
- Ede (1810–1856), Imperial and Royal Chamberlain. In 1848, he was commander of the 2nd Imperial Infantry. In July, he fought against Serbian rebels. He retired as a lieutenant colonel and died in Dresden. He was married to Countess Mary Blankenstein.
- Jenő (1811–1866), Imperial and Royal Chamberlain, Captain in the Imperial Hussars.
- Sándor (1812–1855), Hódmezõvásárhely parish priest and abbot
- Ágoston (1813–1879), Imperial and Royal Chamberlain
- Karolina (1817–1898)
- Emília (1818–1819)
- Amália (1820–1892)
- Jozefina (1821–1861)
- Adolf (1824–?)
- Felícia (1826–1883)

== Life ==
=== Early life ===
Little is known about Vécsey's childhood. However, it is known that he spent his summers at the family estate, Vécsey Castle in Solt, with his uncle, József Vécsey, in Gömör County. Since both of his parents primarily spoke other languages, he spoke little Hungarian as a child. Eventually, Vécsey followed the family tradition by pursuing a military career and enrolling in a military academy.

=== Military career ===
In 1820, Vécsey enlisted as a cadet in the 4th Imperial Dragoons. By 1821, he had attained the rank of lieutenant and subsequently transferred to the 5th Hussars. By 1845, he had risen to the rank of major within the 5th Hussars. During the mid-1840s, he assumed command of the King of Hanover's Imperial Army unit, serving under Colonel Ernő Kiss, one of the 13 Martyrs of Arad. Renowned for its distinction, this regiment had the highest number of officers who later participated in the Hungarian Revolution. By the spring of 1848, the regiment was stationed in Nagybecskerek.

=== Marriage ===
Károly Vécsey married Carolina Duffaud on 15 August 1849. Shortly after their marriage, she gave birth to a stillborn child. Their union did not result in any other children.

== Hungarian Revolution ==
=== Campaign against the Serbs ===
At the onset of the Hungarian Revolution of 1848, a significant campaign was launched in the south against the Serbians. The Austrians had promised the Serbians, along with other ethnic groups, various concessions in exchange for their support against the Hungarian revolutionaries. Vécsey did not particularly distinguish himself during this campaign, but as Sebő Vukovics noted, he was "without notable actions, but sufficiently fulfilled his duty".

Despite this, he was promoted to colonel on 12 October 1848. Following his promotion, Ernő Kiss assumed command of Vécsey's former regiment, while Vécsey took command of an army brigade. On 15 December, he was appointed a division commander, and on 12 December, he was promoted to major general. Subsequently, the 2nd Hussars were commanded by Major Gusztáv Pikéthy, serving as the temporary regimental commander.

In early January 1849, the Hungarian government decided to withdraw its forces from Bačka (Bácska) and Banat to consolidate strength closer to Debrecen, the provisional Hungarian capital on the Tisza River. This decision led to a morale crisis, as the soldiers began to question their ability to face Imperial troops rather than Serb rebels.

To address this issue, the officers of the Verbász Bácska Corps held a meeting led by Count Sándor Esterházy. During the meeting, Esterházy expressed his belief that the Emperor would likely not break his oath and have Imperial soldiers fight against one another.

The corps faced potential destruction due to an attempted coup until Vécsey, Colonel János Lenkey, and József Baudisz intervened. As a result, Esterházy Maj and approximately forty officers departed, while the majority of the troops chose to remain with the Hungarian army convoy. The resolution of this crisis relied on the solidarity of the army to sustain the revolution.

Lajos Kossuth expressed his gratitude to Vécsey in a letter, acknowledging the efforts of the officers in preserving the unity of the forces.

=== Second battle of Szolnok ===
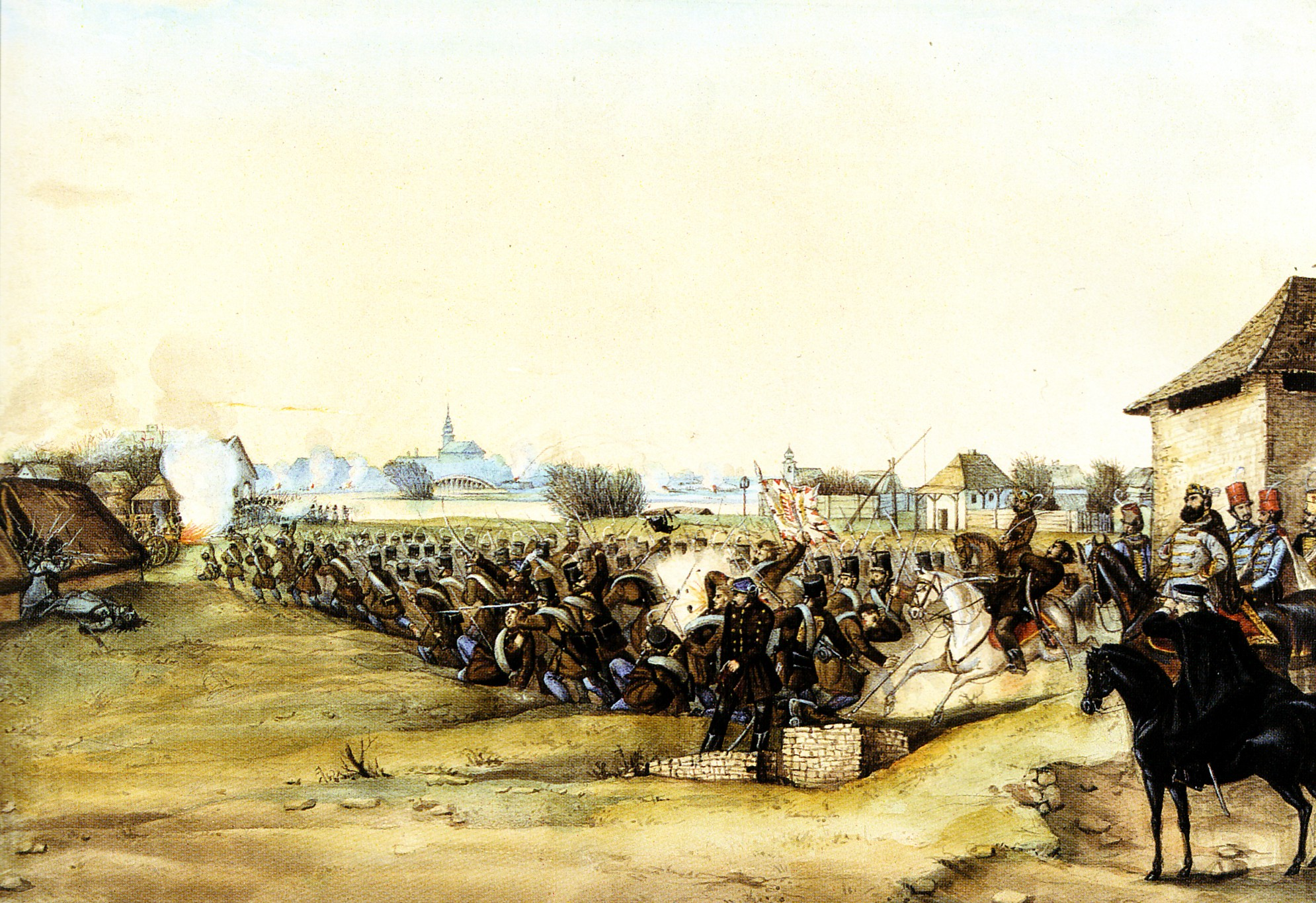
Second Battle of Szolnok by Than Mór

Following Esterházy's departure on 17 January, Vécsey assumed command of the corps for the evacuation of Bačka and subsequently joined the main army. A portion of the army's strength had been stationed in Szeged. Consequently, the battalion, operating at half strength, arrived in Törökszentmiklós on 12 February and remained stationed there for the next two weeks.

During this time, the standing army, under the leadership of János Damjanich, dispatched reinforcements to Major General Józef Bem in the Transylvanian theater. Meanwhile, Henryk Dembiński, newly appointed commander-in-chief of all Hungarian forces, orchestrated a counterattack. This plan involved using the army's two primary divisions to assault the Szolnok bridgehead while diverting Windisch-Grätz's attention elsewhere.

Although Dembiński intended to destroy key strategic positions, including a chapel, these orders were not carried out. This failure led to a battle for control of the Szolnok bridgehead on 2 March.

Vécsey's division launched an attack on Szolnok, diverting Major Leopold Karger's brigade while Damjanich's division crossed the Tisza into the Imperial side. However, due to delays, the operation failed.

The commanders regrouped and planned another assault to capture the bridgehead. This attack took place on 5 March and resulted in a decisive Hungarian victory. For his role in the victory at Szolnok, Vécsey was awarded the Hungarian Order of Military Merit, III Class.

After this battle, Vécsey was promoted to the rank of general, a move that prompted General Damjanich to complain. Vécsey was popular among the soldiers, which led Damjanich to view him as a rival. This rivalry escalated into a serious dispute between the two generals, with both refusing to cooperate—a situation that highlighted the shortcomings of the Hungarian high command.

Vécsey, however, was recognized for his noble actions when he resolved the conflict by placating his rival. He handed over his two divisions to Damjanich, allowing the formation of a corps commanded by Damjanich, with Vécsey serving as second in command.

=== Siege of Arad ===
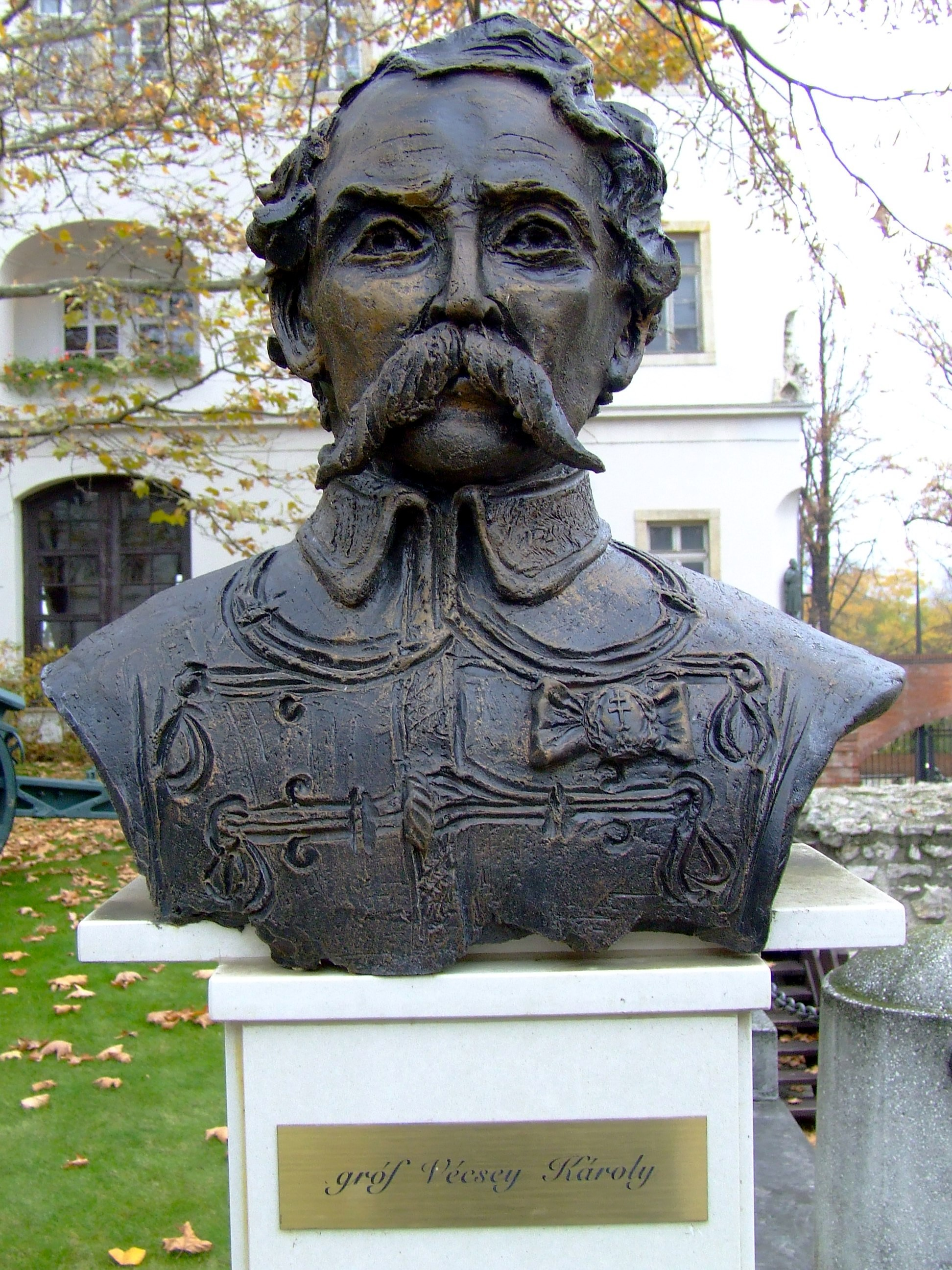
Bust of Vecsey at the Budapest museum

On 7 April 1849, Vécsey was appointed to command the Sun Corps during the Siege of Arad Castle. Initially, the position seemed unsuitable for him, as his background as a cavalry commander left him with little technical knowledge of siege tactics. However, he eventually utilized his exceptional organizational skills more effectively than his predecessors, significantly improving the situation.

Under his leadership, the defenses were reorganized, and the siege guns were well-maintained. Additionally, an influx of supplies from Temesvár bolstered the effort. Vécsey also managed to slow Major General Johann Berger's attempts to blockade the Maros River canal leading into the fort. However, by 25 March, Berger successfully blocked the canal, cutting off any further supplies to the fort.

This blockade ultimately sealed the fate of the castle, as its defenses could not hold indefinitely without resupply. By mid-July, with supplies exhausted, negotiations for surrender began.

Despite this setback, the siege was eventually relieved, and the Imperial troops were defeated. The Imperial forces retreated, bypassing Vécsey's command. In response, he sent Lieutenant Colonel Francis with a brigade to block the retreat. However, Commander Bem canceled this order and called the brigade back, arguing that he had authority over the unit.

A disagreement followed, and on 23 April, Vécsey claimed that his authority and command as a general had been unjustly violated. He wrote a letter from Lugosról to the government explaining the situation. In a strongly worded letter, Sándor Petőfi expressed his views, which were later published in a newspaper in Cluj.

Although the government resolved the case, Vécsey demanded that the military courts examine the accuracy of Bem's statements. The situation was ultimately resolved by Kossuth, who facilitated a compromise in which both commanders retained their respective commands. Vécsey was also awarded a second Hungarian Order of Military Merit for his service.

The Hungarian leadership was critical of Vécsey, believing him to be temperamental and prone to misusing his military talent. In a letter, Nicholas Perczel Kossuth wrote that during the siege of Arad, Vécsey was "very much shooting out uselessly." However, his subordinates, both officers and soldiers, spoke highly of him, praising his strategic knowledge and his treatment of the men. He was particularly popular among the enlisted men, as he did his best to ensure they were as well-equipped and provided for as the officers. Vécsey also made significant efforts to accommodate the religious practices of his men.

Despite his popularity, on 24 June, the Council of Ministers decided to replace him with Richard Guyon as commander of the corps. However, the officers rallied behind Vécsey to prevent his replacement.

=== Siege and Battle of Temesvár ===
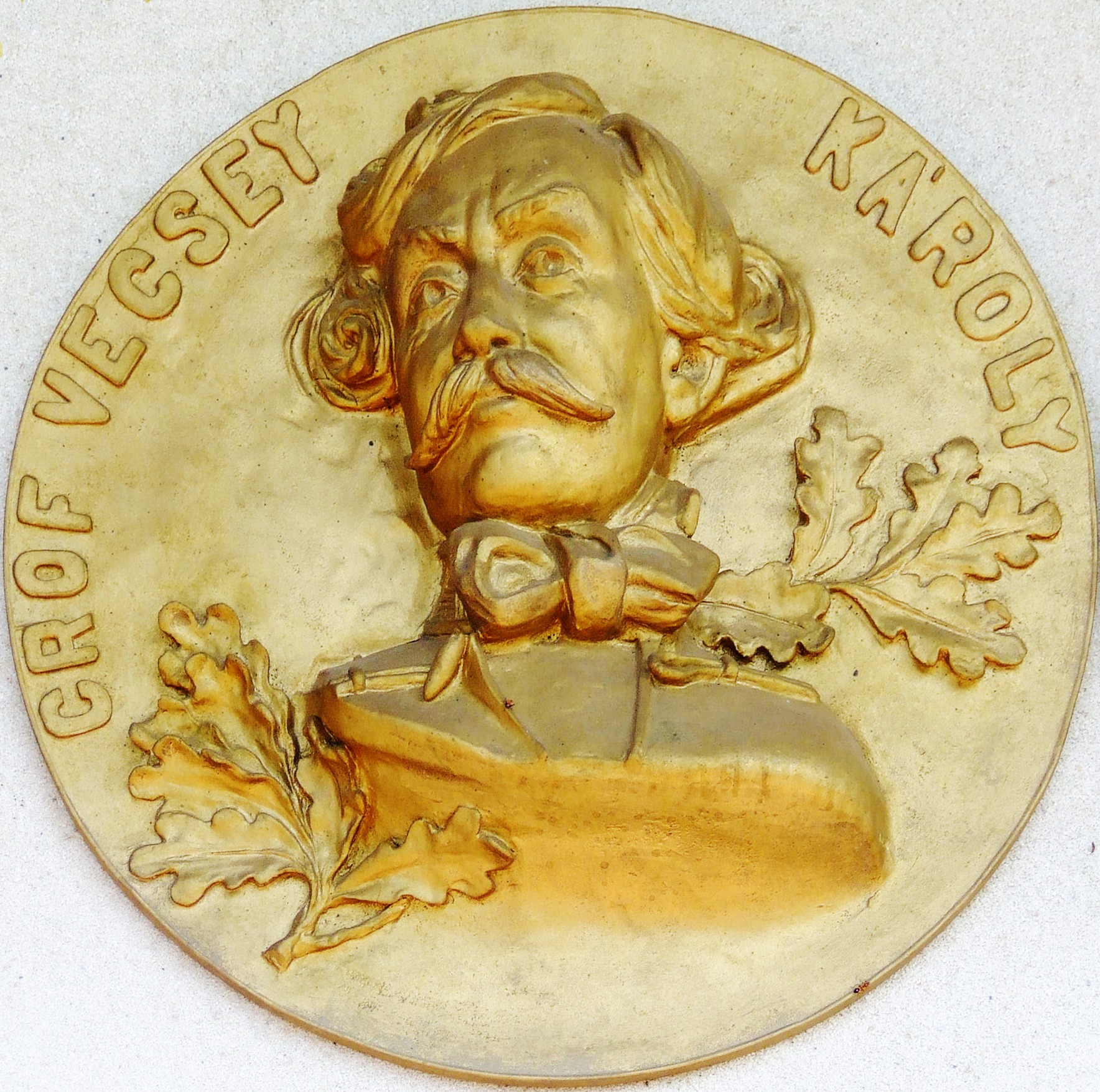
Relief of Vecsey at the Keceli Military Museum

After General Bem's successful campaign in Transylvania, Banat was tasked with the occupation and reconstruction of the region. The campaign began in April, with the first objective being the occupation of Temesvár. However, it soon became apparent that the 9,000 soldiers and 213 guns were insufficient, leading to the attack being halted and resulting in a prolonged siege. Bem handed over command to Banat, who then reorganized the troops.

On 12 May, Vécsey's forces reengaged in the theater and defeated an Imperial force near Freidorf Castle. At this point, Vécsey and his approximately 4,400 men were unable to advance further due to a lack of munitions and unfavorable positioning.

Vécsey performed well given the circumstances, but he was once again in a dire situation while under siege, with supplies cut off and no fresh Imperial reinforcements. The defenders were unable to break the blockade or drive off any detachments. When the water supply was also cut off, capitulation became a serious option to consider.

Henryk Dembiński, the Hungarian Supreme Commander, attempted to push through Temesvár to relieve Arad by force. However, he was repelled by Imperial and Russian troops. Dembiński's force then retreated to link up with the majority of the forces at Arad, where the guns had already been withdrawn.

On 9 August 1849, the Battle of Temesvár took place when Bem led around 4,000 troops against the IV Imperial Corps. Vécsey sallied forth from Arad during the engagement and joined the battle. Compared to other Hungarian units, Vécsey's unit suffered fewer casualties. Ultimately, although both sides incurred heavy losses, the impact on the smaller Hungarian force was greater, and they were forced to withdraw from the field.

=== Surrender at Nagyvárad ===
After the Battle of Temesvár, the retreating Hungarian army was split into two groups. One, led by Vécsey, headed towards Lugos, while the other made its way towards Karánsebes. Bem planned to move towards the Transylvanian mountain ranges to continue the fight and reunite the remaining Hungarian forces.

After linking up with Görgey's unit, Vécsey once again took a detachment of about 8,000 men to cross the Maros River. The Hungarian army was split in two once more. As they parted ways, General Bem bid Vécsey farewell with the words, "All right, you go, general; I must say the Austrians will hang you anyway!"

After Vécsey's army crossed the Maros River near Tótvárad, he attacked an Imperial brigade, but his forces suffered heavy losses at the hands of Austrian cavalry. The Hungarian army, already battered and depleted of supplies, struggled to perform against the fresh Imperial and Russian troops. At this point, the only goal for Vécsey and his army was to surrender to the Russians first, hoping to secure more favorable terms than if they surrendered to the Austrians.

On 19 August, the Hungarian commanders sent messages to the Russians to initiate negotiations for surrender. Vécsey then marched directly to Nagyvárad, where he surrendered and ordered his soldiers to lay down their weapons.

Lieutenant General Nikolai Leontyin Pavlovich, the Russian adjutant, noted, "a small Hungarian cavalry regiment arrived in Nagyvárad [and] laid down their weapons in our presence. The scene was sad… when they learned that Görgey’s army had fled to the mountains to ... avoid an encounter with the Austrians. This resulted in the Nagyvárad surrender."

The Sun Corps infantry laid down their arms before the Russians on 21 August at Nagyvárad. Vécsey was taken into custody and, a few days later, was brought to Arad and placed under Austrian custody.

== Trial and execution ==
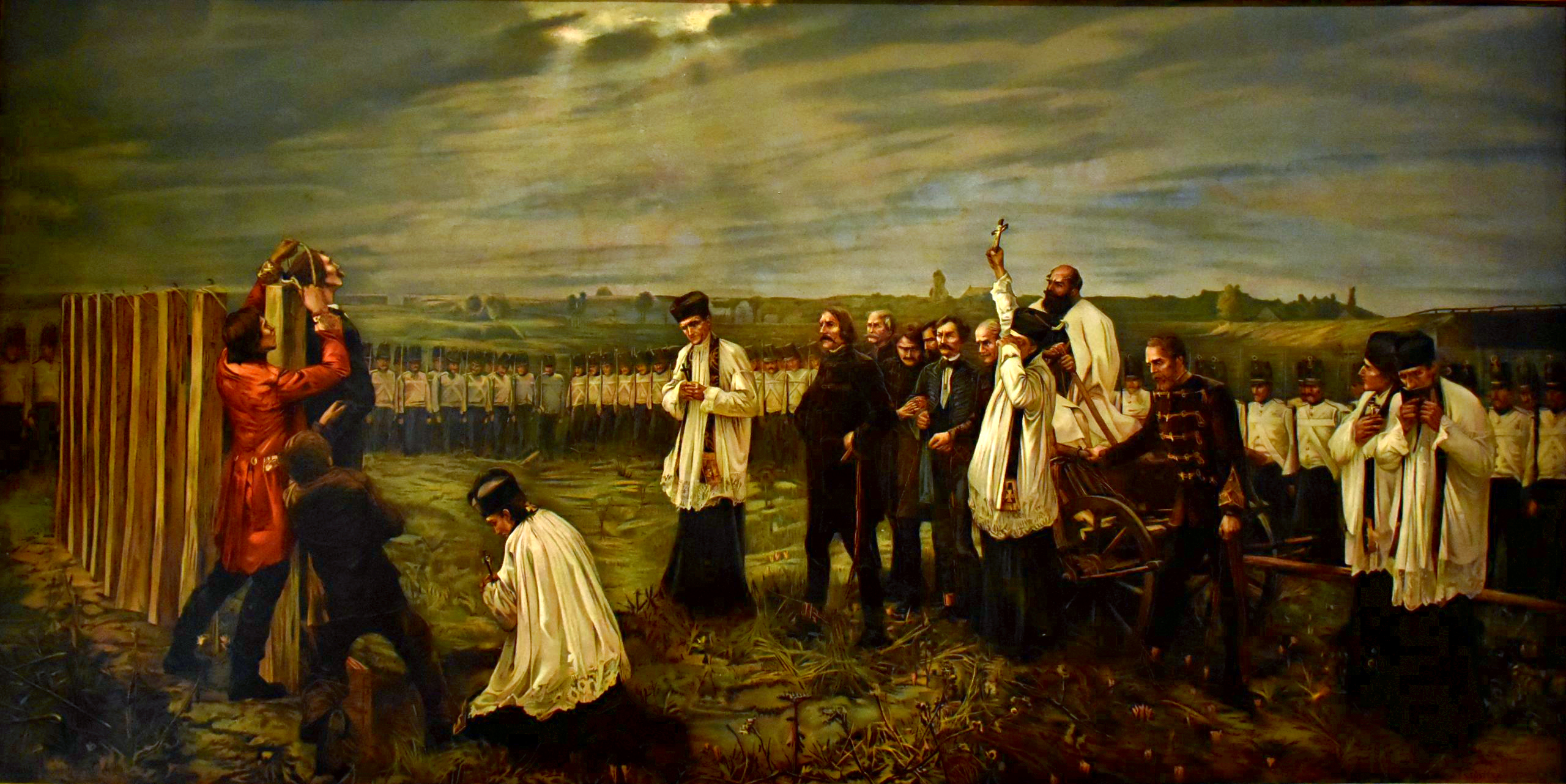
Execution of the Martyrs of Arad. Work by János Thorma.

During the successful period of the Hungarian Revolution, the Austrians sought the help of the Russian army. This was seen as a major blow to Imperial prestige worldwide. When it became apparent that the revolution would fail, the Hungarians believed they had defeated the Austrians and only lost to the overwhelming Russian forces.

However, once the war was over, the humiliated Austrians had their opportunity to take revenge on the defeated Hungarians. A crackdown with harsh terms and conditions soon followed for the Hungarian troops. Nicholas I of Russia advised Franz Joseph to be lenient with the vanquished Hungarians for political reasons and to ease reconciliation. However, the decision for harsh punishment prevailed, driven by a desire to discourage any further resistance.

Vécsey's trial began on 3 September 1849 in a military court at Arad. Vécsey's confession began as follows: "My name is Count Károly Vécsey, I was born in Pest, Hungary, I am forty-two years old, Catholic, married, no children." However, birth records in Budapest make no mention of him during this time. This confession also contradicted his enrollment form at the Military Engineering Academy of Vienna, which stated: "Vécsey, Károly. Born 24 Nov 1803 in Russland zu Retsniow." It was therefore refuted that he was born in Pest.

He was accused, along with many others, of being a ringleader of an insurgency. In his defense, Vécsey stated that "the Hungarian army was not an insurgent army," arguing that it was the army of a legitimate government, and therefore the captured soldiers were entitled to proper military treatment. He further supported this claim by stating that the previous Emperor had approved the Hungarian Constitution, and had thus endorsed the nation.

Vécsey had no supporters, whereas some officers with Imperial connections were able to spare their lives. Count Grünne, an influential member of the privy council, did everything in his power to ensure that Vécsey and the other martyrs received the harshest punishment, as his father had demanded that the rebels be treated as criminals. Vécsey was court-martialed and sentenced to death by hanging on 21 September 1849.

Vécsey read often while in prison. He had no family besides his wife, to whom he wrote a farewell letter the night before his death. The sentence was carried out on 6 October 1849. The execution of the martyrs became a national heroic tale in Hungary, giving rise to many legends. It is difficult to discern truth from myth in the stories of the martyrs. It is said that, as Vécsey stepped up to the gallows, he stopped to kiss the hand of his personal enemy, John Damjanich. This story was recounted in an eyewitness testimony by the monk Eustic Sulyánszky, the confessor of the Martyrs of Arad.

A witness at Arad recalled:

"Vécsey was the last one. He said nothing; he just silently watched all of his comrades die first. At the moment when Vécsey was about to be hanged, there was a great noise from the people. Vécsey straightened up and stared with great interest at the crowd, as if expecting a miracle to arise... But then he, too, was dead."

== Legacy ==
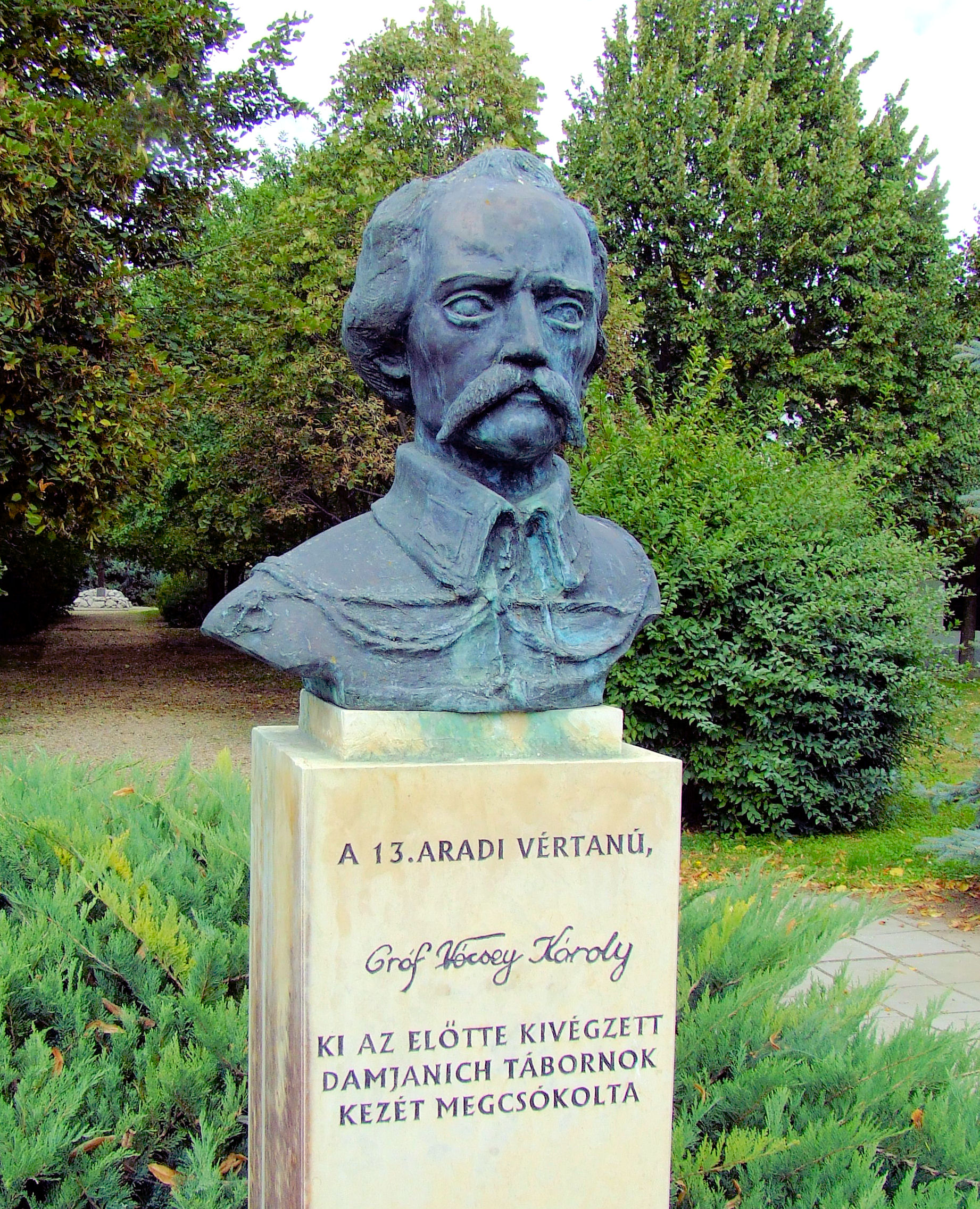
Statue at Vecsey Castle Park

In accordance with the Imperial court's orders, Vécsey's body, along with those of the others, was buried in an unmarked grave at Arad. However, Franz Bott succeeded in bribing the executioner to allow most of the bodies to be moved. Vécsey's remains were retrieved by the widow of an Arad lawyer, Catherine Urbányi Andrásné Hegyessy, who delivered them to his wife, Carolina. The remains were transferred to the Arad public cemetery at night, where they were hidden in the Rosa family crypt. A year later, they were moved to a separate vault, where they remained until 1916, when they were taken to the crypt of the Arad Cultural Museum. In 1974, the remains were moved for the final time to a tomb monument at the site of the execution in commemoration.
