= Anton Mayer von Heldenfeld =

Austrian General of the Napoleonic Wars

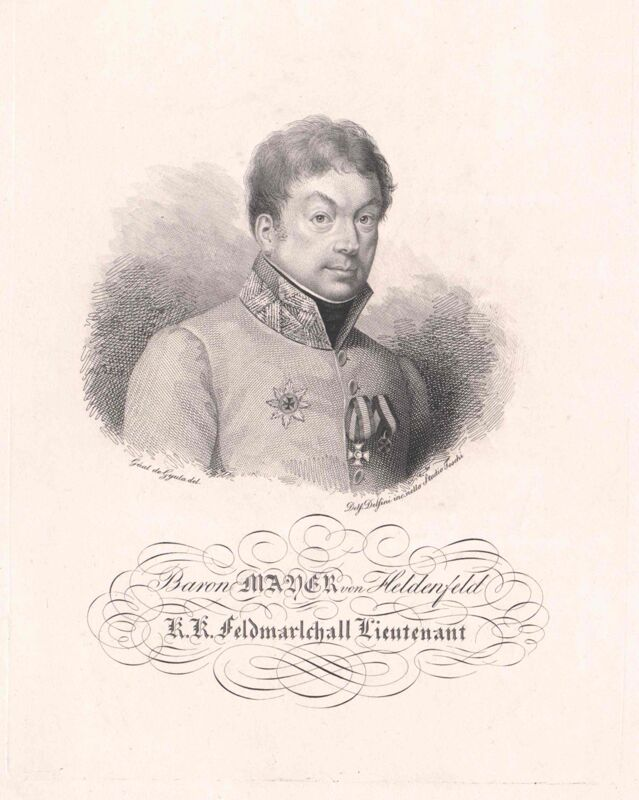
- Portrait of von Heldenfeld, probably engraved in 1829
- Born: 9 December 1764; Prague, Bohemia
- Died: 2 June 1842 (aged 77); Verona, Italy
- Military career
- Allegiance: Habsburg Monarchy
- Branch: Quartermaster General Staff of the Army
- Service years: 1772–1836
- Rank: Feldzeugmeister
- Conflicts: French Revolutionary Wars; Napoleonic Wars

Anton Mayer von Heldenfeld (9 December 1764 – 2 June 1842) was an Austrian general and chief of staff in both peacetime and wartime. Working with Oberst Johann Heinrich von Schmitt, he devised the plan for the victorious campaign of Archduke Charles, Duke of Teschen in Germany in 1796. Appointed Army Chief of Staff in 1806, he began the process of mapping recently acquired territories of the Habsburg Empire and using the process to train general staff officers. He then directed the implementation of the Korps system into the Austrian army in 1808 and set out detailed instructions for the work of individual departments of the general staff.

== Origins ==
He was born in Prague, Bohemia, on 9 December 1764. His father, Johann Mayer, was raised to the minor nobility in 1777, so Anton would go on to inherit the Adelsprädikat (noble title) 'Freiherr von Heldenfeld', although it is often rendered as Heldensfeld. His brother, Johann Mayer von Heldenfeld, would reach the rank of Generalmajor. Initially, Anton joined at the Theresian Military Academy at Wiener Neustadt on 4 November 1772. Upon completing his studies on 19 June 1783, he joined Infantry Regiment Nr.16 Terzi as a Fahnen-Kadett.

== Joining the General Staff ==
Anton first saw action in the Austro-Turkish War (1788–1791). He then transferred to the general staff as an Oberleutnant. After the outbreak of hostilities with France, he was sent to the Austrian Netherlands in 1793. Recently promoted to Hauptmann (captain), he served frequently as chief of staff for various detached corps, including those of William V, Prince of Orange, the Prussian General von Knobelsdorf and Prince Frederick, Duke of York and Albany. That year, he distinguished himself at the Battle of Famars and the battle of Cysoing (23 October), near Lille. In 1794, he again distinguished himself at the Battle of Tournay (1794), at Templeuve during the Battle of Tourcoing, at Oudenaarde during the Battle of Fleurus (1794) and at Mechelen (15 July 1794). For his participation in the assault on the Mainz Lines under Clerfayt on 29 October 1795, Mayer was promoted to major in the general staff ahead of seniority.

== Rhine campaign of 1796 ==
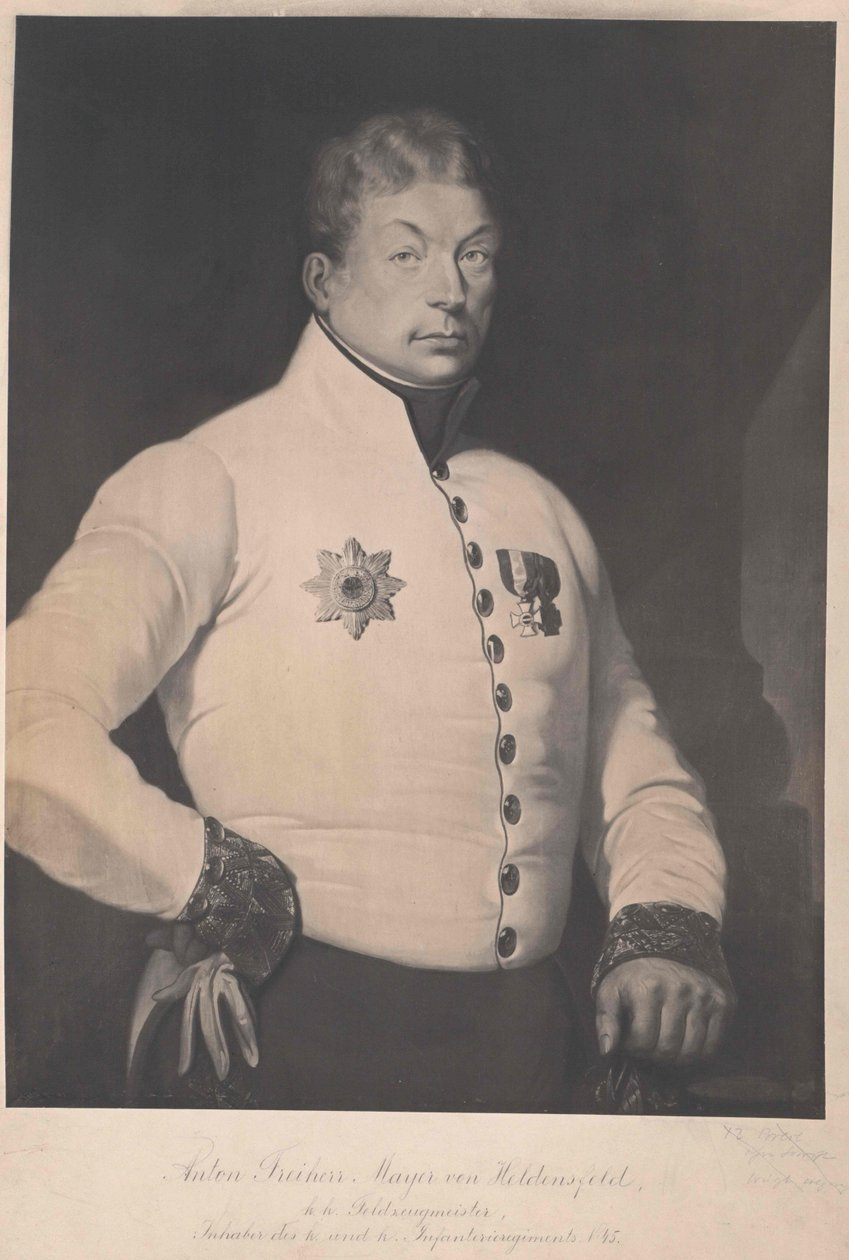
Heldenfeld wearing the Ritterkreuz (Knight's Cross) star of the Maria Theresa Order

In 1796, he was assigned to the General Staff of the Army of the Lower Rhine under Archduke Charles, Duke of Teschen, where he worked as deputy to Oberst (colonel) Johann Heinrich von Schmitt, who had become the chief of staff after the departure of Oberst Fleischer. This pairing would form the operational leadership of the whole Austrian force in southern Germany after Maximilian Anton Karl, Count Baillet de Latour, commander of the Army of the Upper Rhine, subordinated himself to the Archduke in June 1796.

Mayer was however already getting some criticism for his brash and rude approach. On one occasion, the Archduke had to reprimand him to remain silent or he would be immediately sent back to Vienna. The fact that the Archduke retained Mayer on his staff was perhaps a reflection of his considerable abilities and his clear-sightedness. There he distinguished himself in the Battle of Wetzlar and at the action at Gersbach. Working with Schmitt, he planned a cautious withdrawal of the army in the south of Germany. Once this army had broken clear, part would march north to join the army under Feldzeugmeister Wilhelm von Wartensleben. However, after the setbacks in Italy, Foreign Minister Johann Amadeus von Thugut in Vienna, through the Adlatus (adviser) Feldzeugmeister Bellegarde, pressed for an offensive. Archduke Charles was thus obliged to fight the indecisive action at the Battle of Neresheim over three days. However, after screening the French Army of the Rhine and Moselle under General Jean Victor Marie Moreau, the plan was renewed and the Archduke marched north to join Wartensleben in the victory at the Battle of Amberg over the French Army of Sambre-et-Meuse under Jean-Baptiste Jourdan. The Austrians then pursued Jourdan to win a decisive victory at the Battle of Würzburg on 3 September. There Mayer directed the operational leadership of the army and the decisive steadiness of the corps under Feldmarschalleutnant Anton Sztáray. Archduke Charles wrote: "the rapid decision-making and appropriate movements, which Mayer made on his own initiative to occupy and hold the Lengenfeld Hills on 2 September, contributed much to the fortunate outcome of the Battle of Würzburg. These hills were of decisive importance and were defended by eight battalions under the plans of Major Mayer."

For his performance in the battle, Mayer was promoted to Oberstleutnant (Lieutenant-colonel). He would again distinguish himself in the fighting on the Lahn at the Battle of Limburg and in the final phase of the campaign at Schliengen, followed by the siege of Kehl (10 November 1796 – 9 January 1797).

The Archduke was then ordered to Italy after the defeat of József Alvinczi at the Battle of Rivoli to face Napoleon Bonaparte's Armee d'Italie. Oberstleutnant (Lt-colonel) Mayer was sent ahead with three staff officers and some troops to meet Alvinczi and take up the post of chief of staff of the Army in Italy. When Mayer arrived at Conegliano in early February, he found the shattered remains of Alvinczi's army and duly reported the mess back to Archduke Charles. An armistice could not be agreed with the victorious French and once the Archduke had arrived, Mayer pressed for a hasty retreat, but French forces were able to inflict a serious defeat at the Battle of Tagliamento on 16 March 1797. A retreat followed and on 18 April Charles and his staff signed an armistice at the Peace of Leoben.

== 1799 Campaign ==
In 1799, the genial Mayer was appointed chief of staff in the corps of Feldmarschalleutnant Anton Sztáray on the River Neckar, as part of the Army of Germany under Archduke Charles. After directing operations against the Rhine bridgehead at Kehl, he provided the key impetus in the pursuit of the retreating French under Jean-Baptiste Jourdan after the Battles of Stockach and Engen. Mayer has been blamed by some authors, notably Joseph Hormayr, Baron zu Hortenburg for organising the killing of French diplomats at the Second Congress of Rastatt on 29 April 1799 on secret orders from Vienna. These allegations are firmly rejected by some authors. Most attribute the episode to an injudicious order by Army Chief of Staff Johann Heinrich von Schmitt to Mayer, seeking the seizure of the diplomats' papers.

Following this episode, Archduke Charles moved his forces into Switzerland, defeating André Masséna at the First Battle of Zurich. Then, the Archduke marched north into Germany, defeating the French at the Battle of Mannheim (1799), which led to the relief of the French siege of Philippsburg by the corps under Feldmarschalleutnant Anton Sztáray and the capture of Mannheim. After the Battle of Mannheim (1799), Mayer was promoted to Oberst (colonel) on the specific recommendation of Archduke Charles.

== First Reform Period (1801–1805) ==
When the Archduke retired from commanding this army in March 1800, Mayer was sent to Lemberg, Galicia (Lviv). There he directed the mapping of West Galicia, the territory acquired by the Habsburg Empire under the Third Partition of Poland

== 1805 Campaign ==
In 1805, Archduke Charles initially ensured that Mayer was appointed Quartermaster General (chief of staff) of the army in Germany, under Archduke Ferdinand Karl Joseph of Austria-Este. Mayer wanted to halt the Austrian advance into Bavaria at the Lech River as originally planned. However, manoeuvring at the court in Vienna led to the appointment of Feldmarschalleutnant Karl Mack von Leiberich as Adlatus (adviser) to the Archduke and he pressed to continue the march to the Iller River at Ulm. After Emperor Francis I of Austria upheld Mack's plan, Mayer was transferred to command a division and Mack was appointed Quartermaster-General (chief of staff). In October, Mayer was promoted to Generalmajor and appointed chief of staff to Archduke Johann's corps, in Innsbruck, defending the Strub, Scharnitz and Leutasch passes in the Tyrol to direct operations there in cooperation with the army in Italy under Archduke Charles. After the disastrous Allied defeat at the Battle of Austerlitz in December, he was appointed quartermaster general to the emperor.

== Second Reform Period (1806–1809) ==
When Archduke Charles was appointed Generalissimus (supreme Army commander) in February 1806, he gathered Mayer together with Feldmarschalleutnant Grünne and Generalmajor Wimpffen to carry out the important work of reorganising the army. After the Peace of Pressburg (1805), Mayer was appointed Army Quartermaster-General (Chief of Staff) with a general staff reduced to 61 officers. With his typical energy and incisive mind, Mayer drew up a plan for a system of fortifications in the western part of the empire within a year. Although approved by the emperor and the archduke, the plans were never realised. He developed projects to fortify Komárno and Jablůnka, as well as the Vienna district of Leopoldstadt within the empire.

However, his primary aim in 1806–1807 was to organise the Great Triangulation of the Austrian Empire, assisted by Hauptmann (captain) Ludwig August von Fallon. This was a new survey of the empire to provide correct operational maps, enabling the general staff to acquire precise knowledge of the new border regions and recently acquired territories. He assigned the majority of his general staff officers to the task, retaining just 13 in Vienna. Mayer expected to cover the costs and make some profit from the sale of these maps. So, he set up his own Triangulation Office. Unfortunately, the commercial operation never took off, encumbered as it was by the military administration. All that was published in 1808 was the new mapping of West Galicia, based on the work done in the First Reform Period. However, the mapping operations did enable Mayer to develop command documents and to train general staff officers in considering all operational options, bearing in mind the terrain. Mayer composed the necessary orders himself - his introduction set out his own ides as the new chief of staff - ideas about attitudes expected to service, leadership, and what he expected of his staff.

Mayer's most important contribution was a report on the French corps system and its employment at the Battle of Friedland in 1807. From there and his previous experiences in the wars of the 1790s, Mayer developed his own Army Korps system, which was approved by Archduke Charles to create nine Korps in July 1808. as a series of near-symmetrical forces within the army and used them as a planning aid, later set out as a proposed organisation on 1 March 1809., although these formations were later significantly adjusted.

To further facilitate the development of the Korps system, in early 1809, Mayer also wrote a draft of an Instruktion für die bei den Armeekorps angestellten Chefs vom Generalquartiermeisterstabes. Mit beigelegten Bemerkungen etc. (Instruction for the Chiefs of the General Quartermaster Staff deployed to the Army Korps), which was intended to regulate staff operations. Based on the general instruction issued by Archduke Charles, it was never implemented, due to Mayer's dismissal in mid-February 1809. However, a second edition was published by his successor, Generalmajor von Prochaska. It constituted the first official statement that the Adjutant Staff's duties largely fell within the remit of the general staff. The individual general staff departments were now assigned clearly defined areas of responsibility in the areas of reconnaissance, selection of camps and troop deployments, reconnaissance of field fortifications, etc. The chief of the general staff was personally to maintain the operations journal, which he was not allowed to allow anyone else to peruse.

== 1809 Campaign ==
As war approached, Mayer's planning process was greatly hampered by the lack of stated war aims from the politicians. On 25 December 1808, Mayer was given some initial guidance by Archduke Charles. However, this was so lacking in political context and military substance that Mayer immediately complained he was being asked to draft a plan "like a blind man speaking of colours". In January 1809, as political pressure for war grew, Mayer was initially tasked with working out a defensive plan to use the second-line troops (Line infantry depots, garrisons and Landwehr battalions) to guard the key positions in the western empire. He presented this to the Archduke on 16 January, but Foreign Minister Johann Philipp Stadion, Count von Warthausen had already been pressing for a plan to be drawn up for an aggressive advance, a demand, which had met with tough resistance by the Generalissimus, Archduke Charles. Now, on 2 February, the Archduke relented: he set out his ideas for such an advance and activated the Korps system. The decision to renew the conflict with France was taken on 8 February. So, during the middle part of February, Mayer accordingly drew up the first draft of an aggressive plan for the 1809 campaign. This envisaged the main advance coming out of Bohemia, surrounding the isolated 3e Corps of Marshal Louis-Nicolas Davout around Regensburg from the north. Mayer insisted that an advance before the end of March was essential for success. However, members of the court were anxious about just two Korps being available to defend the main route down the Danube towards Vienna. Disagreements were already beginning to develop between Mayer and the Archduke's General Adjutant, Graf Philipp Ferdinand von Grünne, amidst clear tensions with other Staff officers, particularly Oberst Maximilian von Wimpffen, over this strategy. Backing Archduke Charles in opposing plans for a popular militia had already put Mayer at odds with Archduke John of Austria, architect of the Landwehr. He was also allegedly having problems with heavy drinking and engaging in self-promotion around the salons of Vienna. On 19 February, as the army prepared to march, Mayer was relieved of his duties as army Quartermaster-General and sent to Slavonski Brod in the Slavonia Military Frontier, to take over command of its fortress. At the end of the war, when he was hastily recalled to Vienna to advise on the military situation, Mayer was promoted to Feldmarschalleutnant on 10 September 1809.

== Last Napoleonic Wars ==
Mayer remained commander of the fortress until 1810, when he was promoted to Feldmarschalleutnant and Inspector in Galicia. Austria joined the Allies in August 1813, when he was appointed to command a division in the corps of General der Kavallerie (General) Klenau, who praised "Mayer's strenuous activity and insightful conduct" at the Battle of Leipzig in October 1813. Mayer then joined the Siege of Danzig (1813).

At the beginning of 1814, Mayer moved to Italy to command a division against the Franco-Italian forces under Eugène de Beauharnais, where he displayed his usual prudence in the Battle of the Mincio River (1814). On 8 February 1814, Mayer was tasked with holding the junction of the roads around Castiglione and Roverbella. Guarding the Austrian left, Mayer's division faced the main brunt of Eugene's assault. At a critical moment, he went on the offensive, despite being heavily outnumbered, and took Pellaloco. He was then able to disengage his troops and fall back north to Mozzecane. Later that month, he directed the blockades of Mantua and Legnago. At the end of the 1814 war, Mayer was appointed Military Governor of Mantua fortress, where he served until his retirement from the army on 08 February 1836.. Amidst a growth in Italian nationalist groups, on 1 June 1814, Mayer issued a proclamation announcing that all secret societies were prohibited in his jurisdiction. This proscription was soon extended to all Lombardy and Venetia. In 1816 he became Inhaber of the newly reformed Infantry Regiment 45 and on retirement, was promoted to Feldzeugmeister after 53 years of service. In 1831, he was appointed a Wirklicher Geheimer Rat (senior Privy Councillor). He died in Verona on 2 June 1842.

Throughout his career, Mayer maintained the strategic confidence of Archduke Charles. It was a professional bond that endured despite Mayer's reputation for being coarse, stubborn, and at times openly insubordinate, traits that led to several setbacks in his career. Yet, the army as a whole recognized a clear reality: his abrasive temperament was far outweighed by his analytical brilliance, vast experience, and unwavering devotion to his country.

== Honours ==
Ord.MariaTeresa-CAV

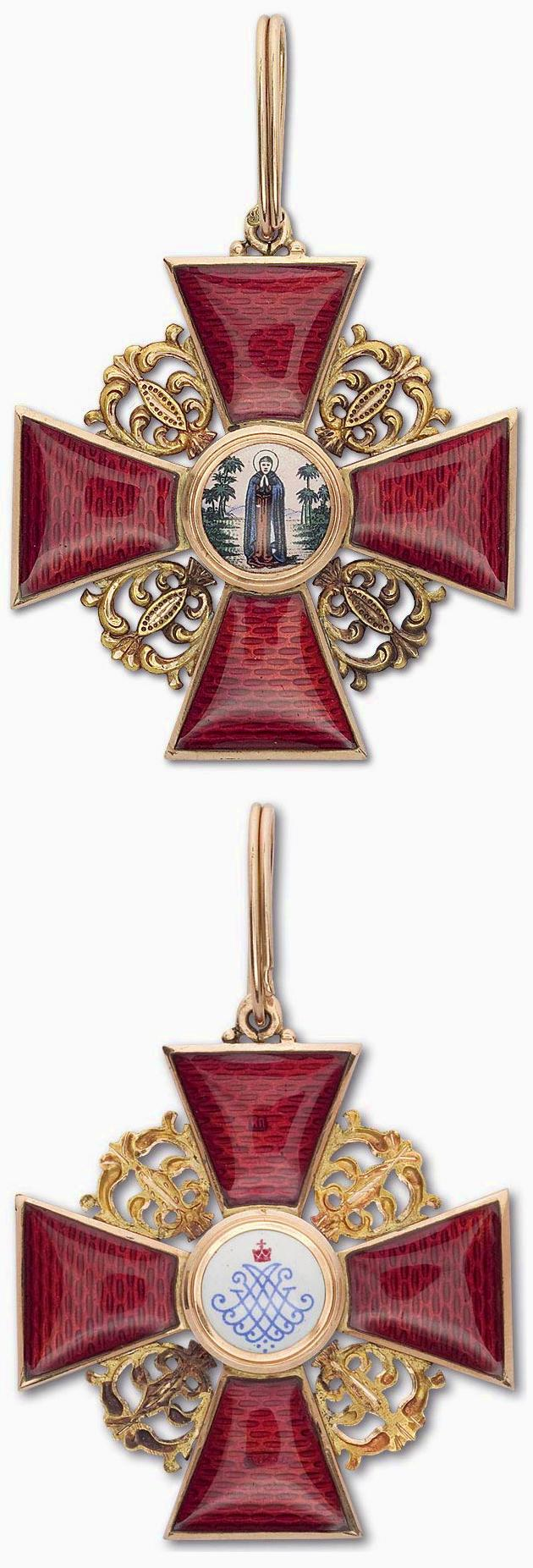
Badge to Order St Anna 1st Class

Knight 1st Class of the Imperial Order of St. Anna (Russian Empire)

For his service in the two campaigns in Germany, Mayer was appointed a Ritter (Knight) of the Military Order of Maria Theresa on 18 August 1801.

On 21 March 1816, he was ennobled with a Baronial diploma (giving him the rank of Freiherr): Transfer of the Baronial status (of Johann von Mayer) to his nephew, the Geheimer Rat Anton Mayer von Heldenfeld, by His Majesty's resolution dated October 22, 1815. The coat of arms displayed: A shield diagonally divided red and blue. In the upper red field, an armoured arm, adorned with golden clasps, brandishing a naked sword on a golden hilt, accompanied by three silver clovers. In the lower blue field, on a grassy ground extending at the foot, stands an armoured man with an open visor, holding in his upright right hand a yellow flag with a black crossbar fluttering to the left, and resting his left hand on a golden wheel. On the shield rests the baronial crown, on which rises an open, crowned tournament helmet placed in the visor. From the helmet's golden crown, between two buffalo horns facing outward, the right horn is cross-divided in blue and gold, the left in silver and red, and from each of the mouth holes protrude two ostrich feathers: one gold and blue from the right, and one silver and red from the left. The helmet covers are blue and gold on the right, and red and silver on the left.

== Bibliography ==
- Angeli, Moriz, Edler von: Erzherzog Carl von Österreich als Feldherr und Heeresorganisator Vol. 4 (1896) Vienna & Leipzig: Wilhelm Braumüller
- Criste, Oskar: Erzherzog Carl von Osterreichvol. 1 (1912) Vienna: Wilhelm Braumüller
- Hirtenfeld, Jaromir: Der Militär-Maria-Theresien-Orden und seine Mitglieder: nach authentischen Quellen bearbeitet (1857) Vienna, Kaiserlich-königliche Hof- und Staatsdruckerei
- Hollins, David: Elite No. 101: Austrian Commanders of the Napoleonic Wars 1792-1815 (2004) Oxford: Osprey Military Publishing
- Mayerhoffer von Vedropolje, Eberhard et al: Krieg 1809. Nach den Feldakten und anderen authentischen Quellen bearbeitet in der Kriegsgeschichtlichen Abteilung des K. und K. Kriegsarchivs (1907) Vienna: L. W. Seidel
- Kriegsarchiv, Vienna: Nachlasse B/857: Mayer von Heldenfeld, Anton Freiherr at: https://www.archivinformationssystem.at/detail.aspx?ID=87616
- Kriegsarchiv, Vienna: Nachlasse B/197: Wolf-Schneider, Oskar: 6/VII Der österreichisch-ungarische Generalstab, Studie über dessen Errichtung, Organisation und Entwicklung 1758-1918 at: https://www.archivinformationssystem.at/detail.aspx?ID=75773
- Kriegsarchiv, Vienna: Mittheilungen des k.k. Kriegs-Archivs (1881) Zwei zeitgenössische Stimmen (Gentz und Mayer) über die Schlacht bei Jena und Auerstädt im Jahre 1806pp186-212
- Kudrna, Leopold:Biographical Dictionary of all Austrian Generals during the French Revolutionary and Napoleonic Wars 1792-1815, at www.napoleon-series.org
- Müller, Georg: Der Rastadter Gesandten-Mord (1873) Leipzig: Sturm und Koppe
- Nafziger, George: The Defense of the Napoleonic Kingdom of Northern Italy, 1813-1814 (2002) Westport, Connecticut, USA: Praeger Publishing
- North, Jonathan, ed. The Napoleon Options: Alternate Decisions of the Napoleonic Wars (2000) London: Greenhill Books.
- Rauchensteiner, Manfried: Kaiser Franz und Erzherzog Carl Dynastie u. Heerwesen in Österreich, 1796-1809 (1972) Vienna: Verlag für Geschichte und Politik.
- Regele, Oscar: Generalstabschefs aus vier Jahrhunderten: Das Amt des Chefs des Generalstabes in der Donaumonarchie. Seine Träger und Organe von 1529 bis 1918 (1966) Herold: Vienna
- Rothenberg, Gunther Napoleon's Great Adversaries The Archduke Charles and the Austrian Army, 1792-1814 (1982) London: B. T. Batsford
- Schzl.: "Mayer von Heldenfeld, Anton Freiherr" in: Allgemeine Deutsche Biographie Vol 21 (1885): Leipzig: Duncker & Humblot
- Svoboda, Johann: Die Theresianische Militär-Akademie zu Wiener-Neustadt: und ihre Zöglinge von der Gründung der Anstalt bis auf unsere Tage (1894) Vienna: Hof- und Staatsdruckerei
- Vaterländische Blätter für den österreichischen Kaiserstaat, Vol.2: Trigonometrische Vermessung der österreichischen Monarchie unter der Leitung des k k Herrn Generalmajors und Generalquartiermeisters Mayer von Heldenfeld (1808) Vienna: Degensche Buchhandlung
- Wurzbach, Constantin: Biographisches Lexikon des Kaiserthums Oesterreich Vol. 18 (1894) Vienna: Kaiserlich-königliche Hof- und Staatsdruckerei
- Zeinar. Hubert: Geschichte des österreichischen Generalstabes (2006) Vienna: Böhlau
