= Battle of the Mincio River (1814) =

1814 battle during the War of the Sixth Coalition

- Part of the War of the Sixth Coalition
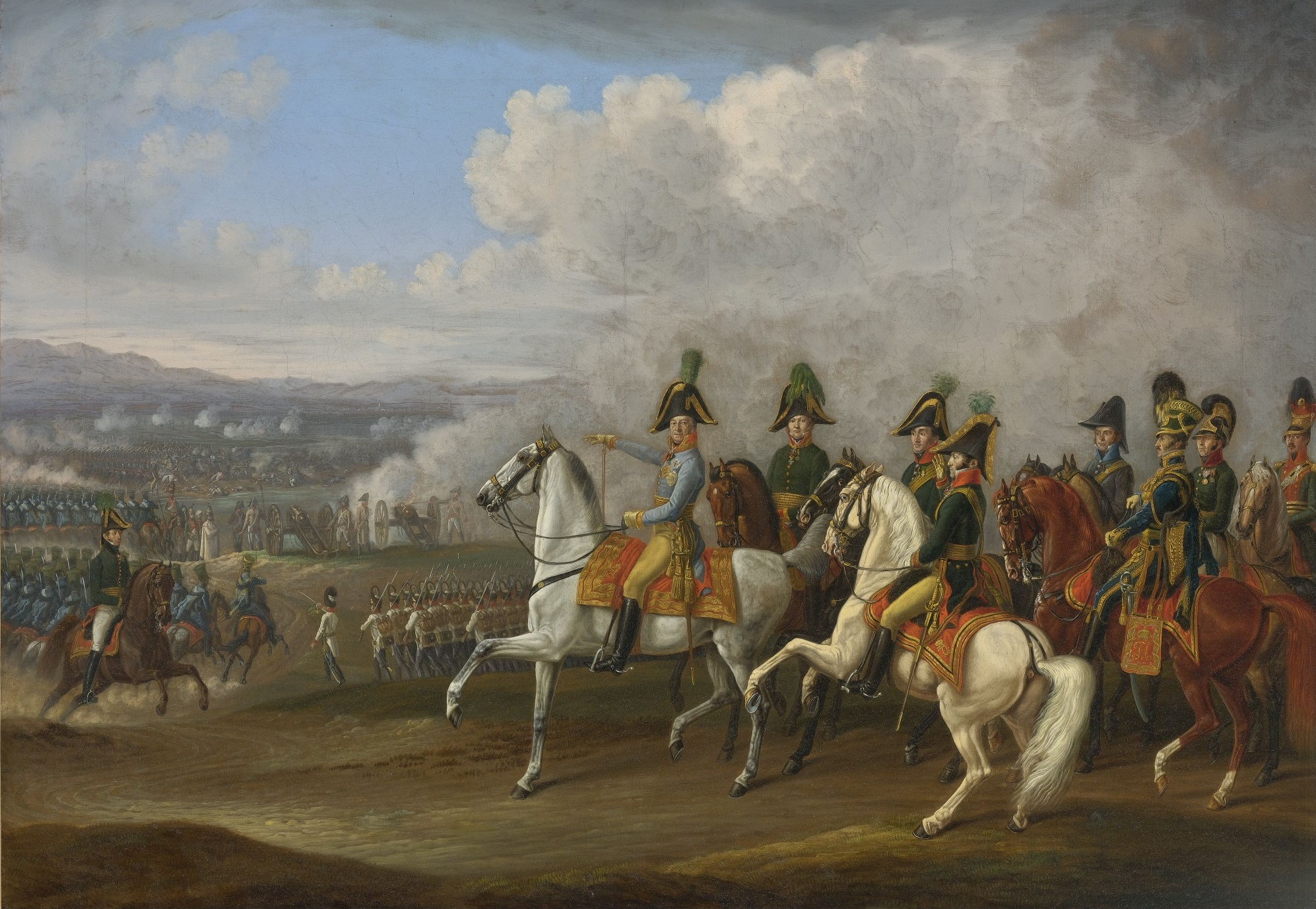
- Field Marshal Heinrich von Bellegarde and his staff at the battle of the Mincio River, by Albrecht Adam.
Date	8 February 1814
Location	Mincio River, Kingdom of Italy (Napoleonic) present-day Italy 45°04′16″N 10°58′55″E
Result	Franco-Italian victory (see § Aftermath)

Belligerents
(France) First French Empire; (Kingdom of Italy (Napoleonic)) Kingdom of Italy	Austrian Empire

Commanders and leaders
(Kingdom of Italy (Napoleonic)) Eugène de Beauharnais	(Austrian Empire) Heinrich von Bellegarde

Strength
34,000	32,000–35,000

Casualties and losses
3,500 dead, wounded, and captured: 3,000 dead or wounded; 500 captured	4,000 dead, wounded, and captured: 2,800 dead or wounded; 1,200 captured

War of the Sixth Coalition: Italian campaign, 1813–1814

In the War of the Sixth Coalition, the Battle of the Mincio River was fought on 8 February 1814 and resulted in an inconclusive engagement between the French under Eugène de Beauharnais and the Austrians under Field Marshal Heinrich von Bellegarde. Fought on the same ground as Napoleon's victory at the Battle of Borghetto in 1796, the battle was not as decisive as Eugène hoped, and in the end it had little significant impact upon the war, whose outcome was to be decided in France rather than Italy.

== Strategic background ==
Following Napoleon's defeat at the Battle of Leipzig in 1813, French armies retreated westwards in a bid to save the Empire from the main Allied thrust. However, the 1814 campaign involved other theaters besides France, and one of these being Northern Italy, which the Austrians were making another attempt to recover. Murat, the King of Naples, had defected to the Allied side and was threatening the main French army under Napoleon's stepson, Eugène. An Austrian army commanded by Bellegarde advanced from the east and convinced Eugène that a battle was needed to eliminate one opponent before he could deal with the other. Since the Austrians were the more immediate threat, Eugène decided to make a stand on the Mincio river.

== Prelude ==
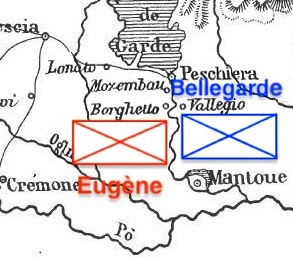

The battlefield was highly awkward for the armies involved; roughly 70,000 men would be fighting on a north–south axis of 20 miles that stretched from Lake Garda all the way down to the fortress of Mantua. The low force-to-space ratio meant that it would take time for each commander to understand the developing situation and would hamper effective responses. The Mincio river that interposed itself between Lake Garda and Mantua was dotted with villages and bridges that would become major focus points as the battle progressed.

Eugène had an army of 41,000, but detached 7,000 troops to guard his southern flank on the Po River, leaving 34,000 for the upcoming battle. His army consisted of the Italian Royal Guards, a cavalry division, and two pseudo-corps (not at full strength) under generals Paul Grenier and Jean-Antoine Verdier. The former's troops were positioned around Mantua while those of the latter defended the fortress of Peschiera at the northern edge of the battlefield. Eugène's plan called for a double envelopment that would eventually unite Grenier's and Verdier's forces and allow them to drive the Austrians from the field. It was a good plan on paper, but double envelopment, especially on this scale, usually works with heavy numerical superiority or tactical mobility, neither of which the French had.

Bellegarde's force was numerically equivalent to Eugène's, meaning rapid manoeuvring would be key if there was to be hope of success. His 35,000 soldiers were deployed in a manner that allowed for the observance of the French-controlled Peschiera and Mantua while still having enough troops to conduct an attack through Eugène's sadly depleted center around the village of Borghetto; a brigade under General Franz von Vlasits guarded against Peschiera, a division under General Anton Mayer von Heldenfeld watched Mantua, and three divisions under generals Paul von Radivojevich, Franz von Pflacher, and August von Vecsey were supposed to be the main thrust through Borghetto and Pozzolo. Bellegarde initially assumed the French would be retreating, but when Austrian patrols spotted a strong 'rearguard' presence across the Mincio, he decided not to commit as many troops as originally planned and ordered the reserve division under General Franz von Merville to remain on the east bank at Pozzolo, a decision which probably saved his army from disaster.

Unknown to either side were each other's intentions, which would become all too clear once the battle commenced. Bellegarde expected Eugène to retreat while Eugène expected Bellegarde not to attack. So when the battle did start, Bellegarde discovering that his southern flank was collapsing and Eugène noticing his weakened center had disintegrated, both sides were stunned.

== Battle ==
Without any conflict, two brigades of Radivojevich's division began to arrive at Borghetto at 8 am on 8 February. The French had abandoned their outposts in the center overnight and this further convinced the Austrians that their enemy was in fact retreating. The Austrians pushed northwest and encountered several French detachments at the village of Olfino, about two miles from Borghetto. When General Verdier went to Olfino to personally assess the situation, he realized he'd been cut off from the main French army in the south and cancelled his offensive. Verdier recalled the Italian division under General Giuseppe Federico Palombini to Peschiera and ordered General Philibert Fressinet's division to face south and guard against possible Austrian drives from Borghetto.

In the meantime, more and more Austrian troops poured into the west bank of the river. The final brigade of Radivojevich, three squadrons of uhlans, and two brigades of Pflacher's division crossed the Mincio between 9 and 10 am. The Austrian reserve division under General Merville arrived at Pozzolo and halted to await further instructions. But while the situation for the French appeared bleak in the center, their southern offensive proved far more successful. There were about 20,000 men being used for this double-pronged attack and there would be two main assaulting points: the fortress of Mantua, from which Grenier would begin, and the village of Goito, a bit further upstream from Mantua and where Eugène was commanding. The vanguard of Eugène's assault was led by General Bonnemains, who controlled the 31st Chasseurs à Cheval, two light infantry battalions, and four guns. General Mayer's outposts were easily overrun, over 500 became prisoners, and Grenier and Eugène finally linked up at the village of Roverbella. In danger of being outflanked, General Mayer retreated three-and-a-half mile north-eastwards to the village of Mozzecane. The French kept pursuing to the north and thought they would meet the main Austrian force around Villafranca, only to be bitterly disappointed. Around 10 am, Eugène heard gunfire on the western bank of the river and was astonished to see much of the Austrian army at a place where he completely did not expect them.

At this point in the battle, the position of the two armies looked rather odd, since many of the troops on both sides occupied the riverbanks where their opponent had begun the fight. Eugène now made the critical and correct decision to keep pressing the attack and hope that his onrushing columns would scare the main Austrian army across the Mincio once more. He detached the Italian Royal Guard back to Goito in order to secure the bridge, reinforced his eastern flank against Mayer, and, with 13,000 men and 30 guns, advanced north to the village of Valeggio, hoping to cut his enemy's line of retreat. Bellegarde's earlier decision to leave his reserve now paid dividends; Merville's dragoons routed General Perreymond's 1st Hussars and captured the brigade's six guns, only to be counter-attacked, driven back, and see the French reclaim five of those guns. Merville had deployed his men into three lines around Pozzolo: the first two were composed of 2,000 elite grenadiers under General Josef von Stutterheim and the third by the dragoons brigade. They awaited an attack by Eugène, who recalled the Royal Guard from Goito to bolster the two infantry divisions under generals François Jean Baptiste Quesnel and Marie François Rouyer. Eugène finally began a combined arms attack and only heroic resistance by Stutterheim's masses, who lost over 700 men, prevented a breakthrough. Realizing the danger of being outflanked, Merville fell back a mile north of Pozzolo. Eugène's men attacked Merville's division in its new position, but at this time sufficient reinforcements from Bellegarde permitted Merville to stem the French tide and ground the battle to a virtual halt. Renewed French drives took them to the hamlet of Foroni, but nightfall prevented the capture of the crucial Borghetto bridge. Meanwhile, Verdier's men to the north had been barely hanging on, but once the sounds of Eugène's guns were manifest, they became emboldened and managed to defeat the Austrian charges.

Bellegarde presumed Eugène would continue his attack in the morning, so he ordered a retreat across the river. But, once again, Bellegarde misjudged, since Eugène wanted to establish contact with his northern wing and quickly pulled his forces back to where they'd come from: Goito and Mantua.

== Aftermath ==
Eugène claimed a victory when writing to his wife after the battle, but in reality it had been a sloppy and inconclusive affair. One way or another, Bellegarde was the one who left the battlefield because of his miscalculation. Casualties were not particularly heavy, 3,500 for the French and 4,000 for the Austrians. Nevertheless, Eugène once again proved that he was a determined and competent commander, and he would do so many more times throughout this campaign; he kept fighting all the way until Napoleon's abdication in April.

== Notes ==
Preceded by Battle of La Rothière	Napoleonic Wars; Battle of the Mincio River (1814)	Succeeded by Battle of Champaubert
