= Hernádvécse =

Coordinates: 48°27′N 21°10′E

- Village
- Interactive map of Hernádvécse
- Country: Hungary
- Regions: Northern Hungary
- County: Borsod-Abaúj-Zemplén County
- Time zone: UTC+1 (CET)
  - Summer (DST): UTC+2 (CEST)

Hernádvécse is a village in Borsod-Abaúj-Zemplén County in northeastern Hungary.

== See also ==
- Károly Vécsey, a martyr of Arad who was related to this village
