= Battle of Lippa =

- Part of part of the Adriatic campaign of 1807–1814
Date	7 September 1813
Location	Lippa, Illyrian Provinces, French Empire
Result	Austrian victory

Belligerents
(France) French Empire: (Kingdom of Italy (Napoleonic)) Kingdom of Italy	Austrian Empire

Commanders and leaders
(Kingdom of Italy (Napoleonic)) GdB Gillot Rougier	(Austrian Empire) GM Laval Nugent von Westmeath

Strength
2,563 men	approx. 2,100 men and 9 guns

Casualties and losses
104 killed, 200 captured (not all units were engaged)	Not known, but very light.

The Battle of Lippa was an engagement which took place on 7 September 1813 in what is now Croatia. The Austrians defeated the Franco-Italians. Though a small engagement, the battle formed part of the Adriatic campaign of 1807–1814, which would lead to the fall of the Illyrian Provinces.

== Background ==
When the War of the Sixth Coalition broke out, the Austrian Empire remained loyal to the French Empire, and foreign minister Klemens von Metternich aimed to mediate in good faith a peace between France and its continental enemies, but it became apparent that the price was to be the dismantling of the Confederation of the Rhine, the Napoleon-controlled union of all German states aside from Prussia and Austria, and the return to France's pre-Revolutionary borders. Napoleon was not interested in any such compromise that would in effect end his empire, so Austria joined the allies and declared war on France in August 1813.

The new Austrian Army of Italy was to attack in the direction of Northern Italy/Piedmont and force a southern front in France. In September the Austrians opened up their Invasion of Illyria, and on 7 September a small Italian garrison fought an Austrian brigade on its way towards Trieste. This action became known as the Battle of Lippa.

The battle ended in an Austrian victory, and the Italians fell back to Trieste.

== Order of Battle ==
Franco-Italian Forces

- Brigade Rougier, 5th Division, commanded by Général de Brigade Rougier
  - 1st Italian Line Infantry Regiment (1 battalion)
  - Dalmatian Infantry Regiment (4 battalions) — French auxiliary regiment
  - 2nd Italian Light Infantry Regiment (1 battalion)
  - Foot Artillery Battery (4 × Canon de 6 système An XI field guns)

Austrian Forces

- Division Nugent, commanded by Generalmajor Römischer Fürst, Laval Graf von Nugent-Westmeath
  - Brigade Csivich, commanded by Generalmajor Ignaz, Freiherr Csivich von Rohr
    - 5th Hussar Regiment "Radetzky" (1 ^{1}/_{2} sqns)
    - Horse Artillery Battery (6 × 3-pdr guns)
  - Brigade
    - 5th Grenzer Infantry Regiment "Warasdiner–Kreutzer" (2nd battalion)
    - 52nd Infantry Regiment "Erzherzog Franz Carl" (1 battalion)
    - Foot Artillery Battery (2 × 3-pdr guns)
