= Leshniv =

Rural locality in Lviv Oblast, Ukraine

Coordinates: 50°14′37″N 25°5′13″E

- Village
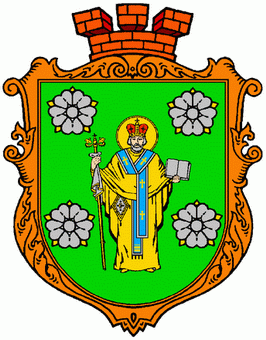
- Coat of arms
- Interactive map of Leshniv
- Country: Ukraine
- Oblast: Lviv
- Raion: Zolochiv
- Area: 1.65 km^{2} (0.64 sq mi)
- Elevation: 201 m (659 ft)
- Population: 1,148
  - Density: 695/km^{2} (1,800/sq mi)

Leshniv (Ukrainian: Лешнів; Russian: Лешнев, romanized: Leshnev; Polish: Leszniów; Yiddish: לעשנעוו, romanized: Leshnev; Hebrew: לשניוב, romanized: Leshniuv) is a village (selo) in Zolochiv Raion, Lviv Oblast, in western Ukraine. It belongs to Brody urban hromada, one of the hromadas of Ukraine.

From 1918 to 1939 the village was in Tarnopol Voivodeship in Poland. It was established in 1471. In 1921 the village had 1472 inhabitants. It has two cemeteries, a church and a cafe. It's around 20 kilometers from Brody.

Until 18 July 2020, Leshniv belonged to Brody Raion. The raion was abolished in July 2020 as part of the administrative reform of Ukraine, which reduced the number of raions of Lviv Oblast to seven. The area of Brody Raion was merged into Zolochiv Raion.
