= August von Vécsey =

Austro-Hungarian general (1775–1857)

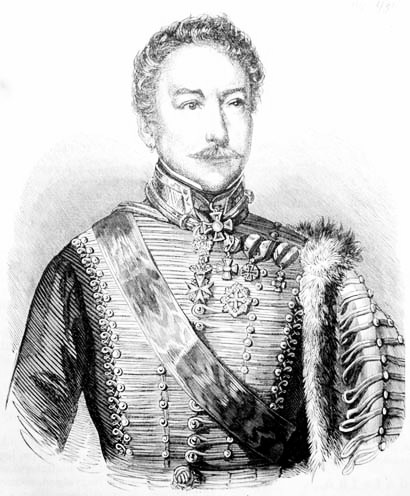
- Born: 22 August 1775; Leshniv, Galicia, Austrian Empire modern-day Ukraine
- Died: 15 January 1857 (aged 81) Vienna, Austrian Empire
- Allegiance: Habsburg monarchy Austrian Empire
- Branch: Cavalry, Infantry
- Rank: General der Kavallerie
- Conflicts: French Revolutionary Wars; Napoleonic Wars
- Awards: Military Order of Maria Theresa, 1806; Order of St. Vladimir, 3rd Class, 1815; Order of Saints Maurice and Lazarus, 1821
- Other work: Graf, 1813; Sovereign Military Order of Malta, 1843

August, Graf von Vécsey or August Vécsey de Hernádvécse et Hajnácskeő (Hungarian: hernádvécsei és hajnácskeői gróf Vécsey Ágoston; 22 August 1775 – 15 January 1857) was an Imperial Austrian general of Hungarian descent who fought in the French Revolutionary Wars and Napoleonic Wars. He won a notable award in 1806 and became a general officer in 1809. That year, he commanded a brigade at Wagram during the War of the Fifth Coalition. His brigade was defeated by superior numbers at Feistritz in September 1813. He led his troops during the subsequent Italian campaign in 1813 and 1814. He was promoted to higher rank in 1820 and 1840.

== Family ==
August Vécsey de Hernádvécse et Hajnácskeő was born of parents Oberst (colonel) Siegbert Vécsey de Hernádvécse et Hajnácskeő (1739–1802) and Sophie von Révay (1743–1791) on 22 August 1775 in Leshniv in the Austrian province of Galicia. Leshniv is now located in Ukraine. His father was promoted to Feldmarschall-Leutnant in 1790. August was the great-grandnephew of General-major Stephan Vécsey de Hernádvécse et Hajnácskeő (1719–1802).

Vécsey married Amalie Karolina Colson (1786–1826) in 1801. They had thirteen children, including Károly, a Hungarian general and one of the 13 Martyrs of Arad.

== Military career ==
He was promoted to major on 26 January 1801 at the end of the War of the Second Coalition and to Oberstleutnant on 25 November 1805 during the War of the Third Coalition. He was awarded the Knight's Cross of the Military Order of Maria Theresa on 28 May 1806. He assumed the rank of Oberst on 31 July 1808 and was named General-major on 24 May 1809.

By this time, the War of the Fifth Coalition was raging. At the Battle of Wagram on 5–6 July 1809, Vécsey commanded a small brigade of light infantry in Karl von Vincent's division of Johann von Klenau's VI Armeekorps. The unit consisted of 178 men of the Broder Grenz Infantry Regiment Nr. 7, one 515-man battalion of the Warasdiner St. George Grenz Infantry Regiment, and a brigade battery made up of six 3-pound cannons.
