= Battle of Caldiero (1813) =

- Part of the War of the Sixth Coalition
Date	15 November 1813
Location	Caldiero, present-day Italy 45°25′26″N 11°11′26″E
Result	Franco-Italian victory

Belligerents
(First French Empire) French Empire (Kingdom of Italy (Napoleonic)) Kingdom of Italy	Austrian Empire

Commanders and leaders
(Kingdom of Italy (Napoleonic)) Eugène Beauharnais	(Austrian Empire) Johann von Hiller (Austrian Empire) Paul von Radivojevich

Strength
16,000–24,000	8,000–18,000 (Note: 12,000)

Casualties and losses
500–1,000 killed & wounded (San Michele)	1,500 killed & wounded 900–1,000 captured 2 guns (San Michele)

War of the Sixth Coalition: Campaign Italy 1813 1814

The Battle of Caldiero on 15 November 1813 saw an army of the First French Empire under Eugène de Beauharnais opposed to an Austrian Empire army led by Johann von Hiller. Eugène, who was the Viceroy of the Napoleonic Kingdom of Italy inflicted a defeat on Hiller's troops, driving them from Caldiero. The action took place during the War of the Sixth Coalition, part of the Napoleonic Wars. Caldiero is located 15 kilometres (9 mi) east of Verona on the Autostrada A4.

When Austria entered the war against Napoleon in August 1813, Eugène attempted to defend the Illyrian Provinces east of Italy. Ultimately, the Austrians compelled the Franco-Italian army to retreat to the Adige River. As Hiller's forces closed in on Verona from the north and east, Eugène tried to fend them off. The viceroy pushed back the northern force, then rushed back to attack Paul von Radivojevich's Austrians at Caldiero. On the 15th, his divisions under François Jean Baptiste Quesnel and Marie François Rouyer drove the Austrians back to Soave. Then Eugène pulled most of his troops back to the west bank of the Adige, leaving only Pierre-Louis Binet de Marcognet's division on the east bank. Hiller attacked Marcognet between San Michele and San Martino Buon Albergo on the 19th, but was repulsed after a hard fight. By this time, a new Austrian threat appeared to the south at Ferrara.

== Battle ==
Historian Alain Pigeard stated that the Austrians lost 1,500 killed and wounded, plus 1,000 captured out of a total of 18,000 troops engaged. He noted that 16,000 French soldiers were present during their victory, but gave no losses. Digby Smith asserted that the French lost 500 killed and wounded out of 16,000 troops in their triumph, while the Austrians suffered 500 killed and wounded plus 900 men and two guns captured. Frederick C. Schneid listed 500 French killed and wounded, 1,500 Austrian killed and wounded, plus 900 Austrians and two guns captured.

== Citations ==
- Bodart, Gaston (1908). Militär-historisches Kriegs-Lexikon (1618-1905).
- Pigeard, Alain (2004). Dictionnaire des batailles de Napoléon (in French). Tallandier, Bibliothèque Napoléonienne. ISBN 2-84734-073-4.
- Schneid, Frederick C. (2002). Napoleon's Italian Campaigns: 1805-1815. Westport, Conn.: Praeger Publishers. ISBN 0-275-96875-8.
- Smith, Digby (1998). The Napoleonic Wars Data Book. London: Greenhill. ISBN 1-85367-276-9.
