= Ignaz Csivich von Rohr =

Austrian military man

Ignaz Csivich von Rohr (1752–1822) was an Austrian Major General during the Napoleonic Wars.

== Life and career ==
Born in Vinkovci in the Slavonian Military Frontier of the Habsburg Empire in 1752. He joined the army as a cadet in 1770, fought in the Coalition Wars. He was promoted to Major in 1796. Colonel in 1800 and while commanding the Military Regiment No. 3 (Ogulinska graničarska pukovnja broj 3) in Ogulin he was promoted to Lieutenant colonel. From 1800 to 1809, he distinguished himself in South Tyrol, and in battles at Sacile, Villa Nuova, San Daniele and he was awarded the Maria Theresa Order for Sacile; fought the French as a General Major in 1813 in Inner Austria. Later he was a Brigadier in Banat, Transylvania and Galicia until 1822, the year he retired after 52 years in the military. He died in Vinkovci, his birthplace, on 30 November the same year (1822).

== Bibliography ==
- Austrian Military Conversation Lexicon. Edited by Hirtenfeld and Dr. Meynert (Vienna 1851) I. Vol. p. 810. – Hirtenfeld (J. Dr.), The Mar. Theresien Order and its members. According to authentic sources (Vienna 1857, Staatsdruckerei, 4°.).
- Hirtenfeld; K.A. Vienna; Wurzbach. PUBLICATION: ÖBL 1815-1950, Vol. 1 (Lfg. 2, 1954), p. 158
