= Giuseppe Federico Palombini =

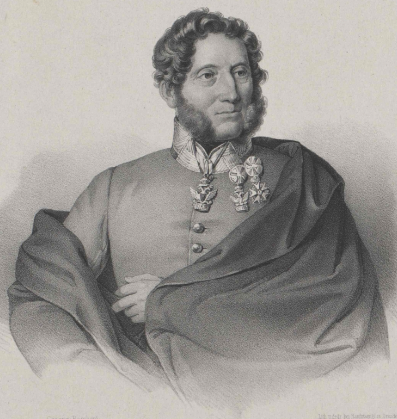
- Joseph Friedrich von Palombini; Giuseppe Federico Palombini
- Born: 3 December 1774; Rome, Italy
- Died: 25 April 1850 (aged 75) Grochowice (Grochwitz), Prussia
- Allegiance: Cisalpine Republic (Kingdom of Italy (Napoleonic)) Napoleonic Kingdom of Italy; Austrian Empire
- Branch: Cavalry, Infantry
- Service years: (Italy) 1796–1802 (Kingdom of Italy (Napoleonic)) 1802–1814 (Austrian Empire) 1814–1824
- Rank: (Kingdom of Italy (Napoleonic)) General of Division (Austrian Empire) Feldmarschall-Leutnant
- Conflicts: War of the First Coalition; Battle of Faenza (1797); War of the Second Coalition; Siege of Ancona (1799); War of the Fourth Coalition; Siege of Kolberg (1807); Siege of Stralsund (1807); Peninsular War; Siege of Roses (1808); Battle of Cardadeu (1808); Battle of Molins de Rei (1808); Battle of Valls (1809); Third Siege of Gerona (1809); Battle of El Pla (1811); Siege of Tarragona (1811); Battle of Saguntum (1811); Siege of Valencia (1812); Capture of Castro Urdiales (1813); War of the Sixth Coalition; Battle of Cerknica (1813); Clash at Peschiera del Garda (1814)
- Awards: Order of the Iron Crown, 1806; Légion d'Honneur, 1810; Order of the Red Eagle, 1846
- Other work: Baron of the Empire, 1811

Giuseppe Federico Palombini or Joseph Friedrich von Palombini (3 December 1774 – 25 April 1850) became an Italian division commander during the Napoleonic Wars. He joined the army of the Cispadane Republic in 1796 and fought at Faenza in 1797. He became commander of a dragoon regiment in 1798. He became commander of the Napoleone Dragoons, of the Cisalpine Republic army, in 1802. He fought as an ally of the French at Kolberg and Stralsund in 1807. He married the daughter of Jan Henryk Dąbrowski (Dombrowski) in 1806.

Transferred to Spain, he fought in Domenico Pino's division at Roses, Cardadeu, Molins de Rei, Valls and Gerona and was promoted general of brigade in 1809. He led a brigade at El Pla and Tarragona in 1811 and was promoted general of division. He led his division at Saguntum, Valencia and Castro Urdiales in 1811–1813. Transferring to Italy, he fought at Cerknica in 1813 and Peschiera del Garda in 1814. After collapse of the Napoleonic Kingdom of Italy in 1814, he joined the army of the Austrian Empire, becoming a Feldmarschall-Leutnant. He became the Inhaber (proprietor) of the 36th Line Infantry Regiment in 1817. He retired in 1824 and died in 1850 at his wife's castle in Grochwitz near Herzberg (Elster).

== Early career ==
On 3 December 1774, Palombini was born in Rome of parents Pietro Palombini and Teresa Spada. He studied drawing in school. On 1 November 1796 or a few days earlier he enlisted in the 5th Cohort of the army of the Cispadane Republic. He was promoted sergeant major on 7 November and second lieutenant on 21 December 1796. His first action occurred on 2 February 1797 at the Battle of Faenza while fighting against troops of the Papal States. He became first lieutenant on 10 May and captain assistant major on 25 May 1798. He resigned from the army of the Cisalpine Republic (successor state to the Cispadane Republic) on 9 September 1798 to take a commission as colonel of the gendarmes of the Roman Republic. In November the same year, Palombini's regiment was converted to dragoons. The unit was involved in operations near Fano on 11 July 1799.

Palombini was at the Siege of Ancona which lasted from 14 October to 13 November 1799. The French garrison was surrounded by an 8,000-strong Austrian corps and blockaded by a joint Russian-Ottoman fleet. The garrison surrendered to the Austrians and were paroled to France on condition to not fight against Austria until exchanged. Palombini was wounded in the shoulder on 2 November while repelling an enemy attack. The French commander Jean-Charles Monnier recommended him for promotion to general of brigade, but it was never approved. After Ancona, Giuseppe Lechi sent Palombini to Bourg-en-Bresse to organize a battalion of the Italic Legion. After the truce following the Battle of Marengo in June 1800, Lechi named him president of the audit board of his division. In October, Palombini led a 170-man Roman battalion in Domenico Pino's division during the invasion of the Grand Duchy of Tuscany. This ended with the capture of Siena after a clash on 14 January 1801, during which he led Pino's advance guard.

Palombini returned to Milan the end of the War of the Second Coalition to find there was no post in the Cisalpine army for him. Despite recommendations from Lechi and Pino, his request to be named general of brigade was rejected by the government. The Minister of War Giovanni Tordorò found him an administrative position in November 1801. He was appointed commander of a battalion of the 1st Light Infantry Regiment on 2 November 1802.

== Napoleonic Italy ==
=== Northern Europe ===
Palombini became chief of brigade (colonel) of the 2nd Hussar Regiment on 23 February 1804 and went to command the unit at the Camp of Boulogne. This regiment later became the Napoleone Dragoons. On 28 August 1806 he married Carolina Amalia Beatrice Dąbrowski, the daughter of the Polish general Jan Henryk Dąbrowski. He was appointed a knight of the Order of the Iron Crown in 1806, and at a later date, a commander of the order. He was part of the Italian contingent sent to Germany to fight in the War of the Fourth Coalition. The Napoleone and Regina Dragoons fought at the Siege of Kolberg which lasted from 20 March to 2 July 1807. The commander of the Italian division, Pietro Teulié was killed during the unsuccessful siege. In July, the division marched to participate in the Siege of Stralsund which had begun on 15 January 1807. With the division under Pino's leadership, the two dragoon regiments joined the besieging force until 20 August when the Swedes evacuated Stralsund.

=== Peninsular War: 1808–1809 ===
In 1808, Palombini went to fight in Spain with Pino's division and stayed there until 1813. After Guillaume Philibert Duhesme's Imperial French army abandoned the Second Siege of Gerona in mid-August 1808, it was clear to Emperor Napoleon that he needed to send more troops to Catalonia. Unlike previous reinforcements, which were "mere sweepings of his depots", first class formations were sent. These were Joseph Souham's French division and Pino's Italian division. Pino's 5th Division comprised three battalions each of the Italian 1st Light, 2nd Light, and 6th Line Infantry Regiments, two battalions of the 4th Line, and one battalion each of the 5th and 7th Line. Jacques Fontane's Italian cavalry brigade consisted of the Royal Chasseurs and 7th Dragoons (Napoleone). The French emperor placed all Imperial troops in Catalonia in the VII Corps under Laurent Gouvion Saint-Cyr.

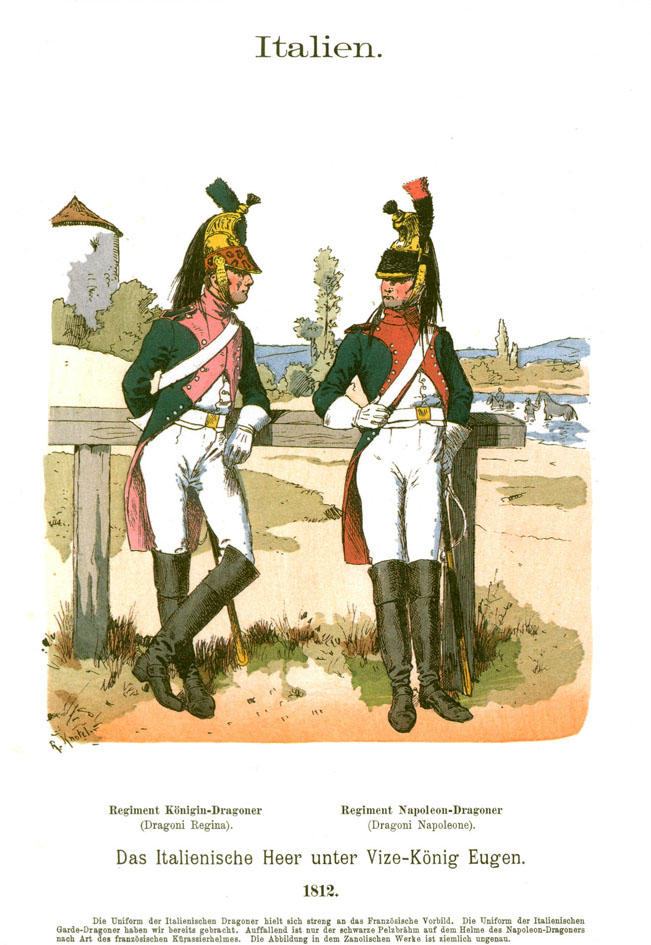
Regina (L) and Napoleone (R) Dragoons of the Royal Italian Army

The Siege of Roses lasted from 7 November to 5 December 1808 and ended with the surrender of the Spanish garrison. The divisions of Honoré Charles Reille and Pino were employed in the besieging force while the divisions of Souham and Louis François Jean Chabot formed the covering force. The cavalry were not mentioned. Pino's division reported 30 officers and 400 men killed and wounded. After the fall of Roses, Saint-Cyr boldly resolved to march to the relief of Barcelona. He took the divisions of Pino, Souham and Chabot, leaving Reille behind. Since he planned to take his 15,000 infantry and 1,500 cavalry across the hills on footpaths, Saint-Cyr took no artillery pieces and only what food and extra ammunition could be carried on mules.

On 16 December 1808 the Battle of Cardadeu (Llinas) was fought. Finding 9,000 Spanish troops under Juan Miguel de Vives y Feliu blocking his path, Saint-Cyr left Chabot's small division to guard his rear and planned to hurl 13,000 troops from Pino's and Souham's divisions at his foes. Saint-Cyr insisted that the assault be carried out in a massed column with Pino's division in the lead. However, Pino disobeyed orders and deployed the seven battalions of his leading brigade. The initial attack drove back the first Spanish line but was repulsed by the second line. In this crisis, Saint-Cyr directed Souham's division to angle to the left and ordered Pino's second brigade forward, six battalions strong. As the Spanish defenders began to give way before the two columns, the French commander ordered the two Italian cavalry regiments to charge the Spanish center. Vives' lines crumpled and his troops took to their heels. Saint-Cyr's corps sustained 600 casualties while inflicting 1,000 killed and wounded on the Spanish and capturing 1,500 men and five cannons.

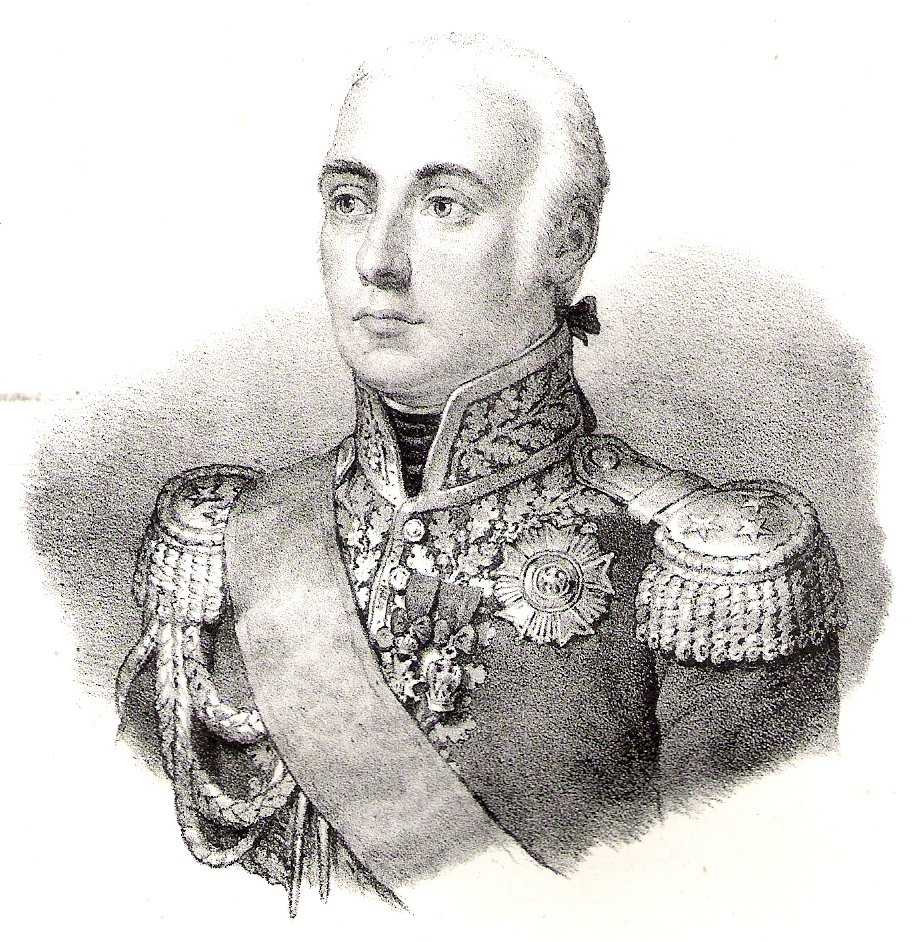
Domenico Pino

With Barcelona relieved, the Spanish army fell back behind the Llobregat River. Since Vives was separated from his army after Cardadeu, Theodor von Reding commanded the Spanish troops. The Battle of Molins de Rei was fought on 21 December 1808. Saint-Cyr ordered Joseph Chabran's French division to make a false attack on the Spanish left flank. Completely fooled, Reding reinforced his left from his right flank. Saint-Cyr then sent Souham, Pino and Chabot against the weakened right flank and rolled up the Spanish line. The Imperial troops rounded up 1,200 Spanish prisoners and captured 25 artillery pieces. Palombini was promoted general of brigade on 14 February 1809.

After Molins de Rei, Reding was reinforced and his army recovered its confidence; he decided to take the field. After a series of maneuvers, Reding decided to return to his base at Tarragona. Hearing of this move, Saint-Cyr blocked both roads that his adversary might use, establishing Souham's division at Valls and Pino's at Pla d'Urgell. After a night march, Reding's army appeared before Souham's division on the morning of 25 February and the Battle of Valls began. During the morning, Reding's superior numbers forced Souham back and the Spanish army had a clear road to Tarragona. At noon, Saint-Cyr arrived in person with the two Italian cavalry regiments. Thinking that the Imperials were heavily reinforced, Reding pulled his tired soldiers back to high ground behind the Francolí River. Because of a muddle in orders, Pino's division did not come on the field until after 4:00 pm. At that hour Saint-Cyr arranged the two divisions in four columns of a brigade each, with the Italian cavalry between the center columns and the French 24th Dragoons on the right flank. Reding's soldiers fired a great volley at 100 yards (91 m) range, but when the Imperials were seen advancing through the smoke, the Spanish lines disintegrated. For the loss of 1,000 men, the Imperials inflicted 3,000 casualties on their foes and seized their wagon train and all their artillery. Reding was mortally wounded by French dragoons.

The Third Siege of Gerona lasted from 6 June to 10 December 1809. One authority wrote that the Spanish garrison lost 5,122 men killed and 4,248 captured, while Imperial fatalities numbered 15,000, half from disease. Jean-Antoine Verdier led 14,000 soldiers of the siege force in the divisions of Lechi, Verdier and Annet Morio de L'Isle while Saint-Cyr commanded 14,000 troops covering the siege. Palombini commanded a 912-man cavalry brigade in Pino's Division, which was part of Saint-Cyr's covering army. On 1 June 1809, the brigade included six squadrons belonging to the Italian Horse Chasseur and Dragoon Regiments. On 10 July, a Spanish relieving column was ambushed and destroyed by Pino's division, losing 40 officers and 878 men captured. The Spanish garrison of Gerona defeated a major Imperial attack on 19 September. After that fiasco, the 1,000 survivors of Lechi's division were incorporated into Pino's division and Saint-Cyr determined to starve out the garrison rather than waste any more lives in futile assaults. Pino's division defeated a relieving column on 26 September and captured its food convoy. On 7 November, Pino's division raided and burned the large Spanish supply dump at Hostalric.

=== Peninsular War: 1810–1811 ===
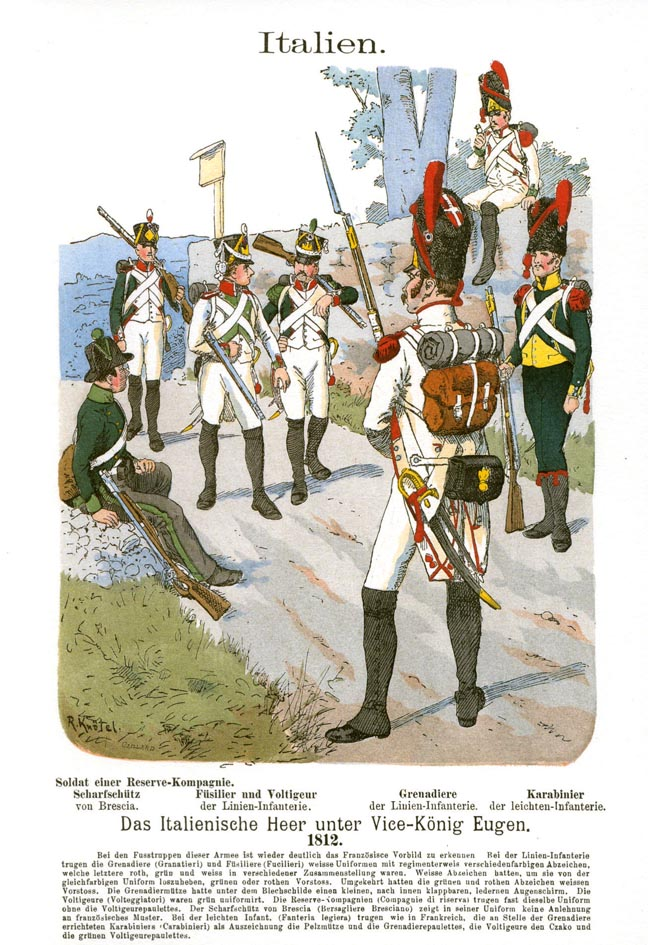
Light and line infantrymen of the Napoleonic Kingdom of Italy

On 15 January 1810, the VII Corps was under the command of Marshal Pierre Augereau. At that date, Pino's division had 238 officers and 6,346 men present under arms, 201 detached, 2,409 sick in hospital and 93 prisoners. With the divisions of Pino and Souham, Augereau made an expedition in January in which all captured miquelets (militiamen) were hanged. In retaliation, the Spanish began killing all Imperial soldiers that they caught. By 15 March Filippo Severoli had assumed command of the Italian division when Pino went home on leave. On 24 April, Napoleon replaced Augereau with Marshal Jacques MacDonald. The new commander rescinded Augereau's orders to kill captured guerillas. MacDonald used Severoli's division to guard large convoys to Barcelona in June, July and August. In 1810, Palombini was appointed an officer of the Legion of Honor.

On 2 January 1811, Louis Gabriel Suchet's III Corps successfully concluded the Siege of Tortosa. No longer needed as a covering force, MacDonald with 12,000 men started back to Lleida (Lérida) by a roundabout march past Tarragona. The Italian division was leading, followed at a distance of 3 miles (4.8 km) by three French brigades and one regiment of cavalry. When Francesco Orsatelli (called Eugenio) detected Pedro Sarsfield's Spanish division nearby, he recklessly attacked with his 2,500 foot soldiers and 30 horsemen. In the Battle of El Pla, Sarsfield's 3,000 infantry and 800 cavalry drove back the vanguard Italian brigade. Eugenio's men rallied when Palombini's brigade reached the field. Utilizing his superior numbers of cavalry, Sarsfield turned Palombini's right flank and broke his lines. The day might have ended in a disaster but Jacques-Antoine-Adrien Delort appeared with the 24th Dragoons and checked the victorious Spaniards. The Italians lost 600 men, including Eugenio fatally wounded, while Spanish casualties numbered only 160.

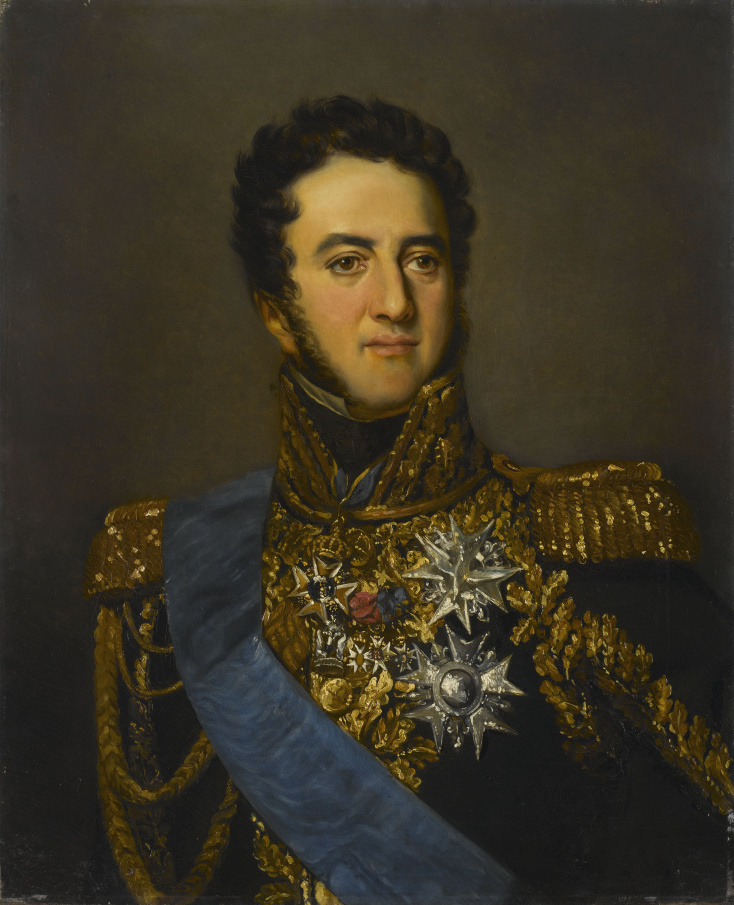
Louis Gabriel Suchet

On 10 March 1811, Napoleon transferred a large part of the VII Corps to the III Corps under Louis Gabriel Suchet. At that time the Italian division became part of Suchet's command. During the Siege of Tarragona, the two Italian brigades served in a composite division under Jean Isidore Harispe. They covered the siege lines on the east side. At 7:00 pm on 21 June 1811, Palombini led the storming columns against the lower city. The assault force, which was made up of 1,500 grenadiers and voltigeurs from the French regiments plus a French brigade, was successful and the lower city was seized. Imperial casualties were 120 killed and 362 wounded. During the final assault on 28 June, Juan de Courten and 3,000 Spanish troops tried to escape from the east side of Tarragona, but were blocked by the Italians. Some escaped to the Royal Navy warships offshore, a handful scattered into the hills, many others were cut down by Imperial cavalry on the beach, but most were captured.

On 11 July 1811, Palombini was promoted general of division. That year, Napoleon raised him to the dignity of Baron of the Empire. On 15 July 1811, the III Corps was renamed the Army of Aragon with Luigi Gaspare Peyri in command of the Italian division. Pino's old division was still made up of the 1st and 2nd Light and the 4th, 5th and 6th Line Infantry Regiments, plus the Chasseurs and the Napoleone Dragoons. Palombini led a column through Caldes de Montbui and Sant Feliu de Codines to join Suchet's main column at Centelles. After the Battle of Montserrat on 25 July, Suchet installed Palombini's brigade as a garrison for the Santa Maria de Montserrat Abbey which previously functioned as a Catalan supply base.

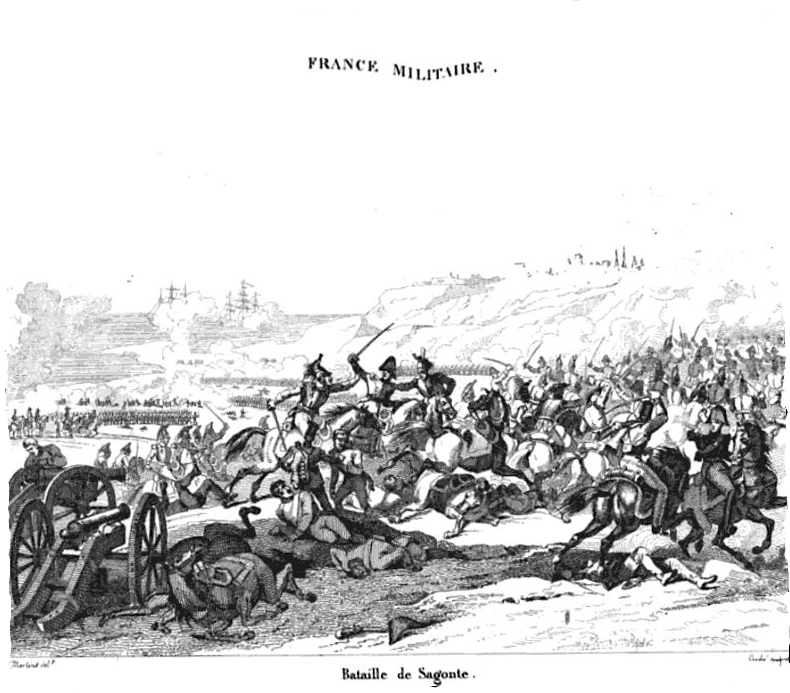
The charge of the 13th Cuirassiers at the Battle of Saguntum

Suchet launched the invasion of Valencia Province with 22,000 soldiers in three French divisions under Harispe, Louis François Félix Musnier and Pierre-Joseph Habert, Palombini's Italian division, a weak brigade of Neapolitans, cavalry and artillery. Palombini's 6,219-man division included Vertigier Saint Paul's brigade, the 2nd Light Infantry (2,200) and 4th Line (1,660), and Éloi Charles Balathier's brigade, 5th Line (930) and 6th Line (1,429). On 15 September 1811, Suchet's army advanced in three columns, the center one under Palombini consisted of his own division and 1,500 Neapolitans. On 19 September, Palombini's troops joined Suchet's coastal column without incident. On 28 September an unsuccessful assault was made on Sagunto Castle in which 52 Italians became casualties. Two days later, Palombini's troops drove a Spanish division away from Segorbe. On 20 October, Palombini with one French and one Italian brigade again raided Segorbe and quickly returned by the 24th.

The Battle of Saguntum took place on 25 October 1811. Spanish commander Joaquín Blake attacked with 17,000 men in his left wing and 10,500 in his right wing, but his best troops were on the right. Suchet maintained the siege of Sagunto Castle with 4,000 troops including Balathier's brigade. The French commander faced Blake with 14,000 troops; Saint Paul's brigade and the cavalry were in reserve. Suchet's 4,500-man right wing under Józef Chłopicki completely routed Blake's left wing with the help of Colonel Schiazetti's Napoleone Dragoons. Blake's right wing troops put up a good fight and 1,100 Spanish cavalry drove off three French squadrons in the center. In this crisis, Suchet ordered the 13th Cuirassiers to charge and ordered Palombini to commit the reserve infantry brigade. The cuirassiers routed most of the Spanish horsemen and rode down a Spanish battery. Saint Paul's brigade drove off the remaining enemy cavalry and crashed into the exposed flank of a Spanish infantry division, forcing it into retreat. According to historian Charles Oman, Saint Paul's attack was the decisive stroke that won the battle.

Blake posted his 23,000-man army behind the Turia River protecting Valencia. On 26 December 1811, Suchet advanced with 30,000 troops, sending Habert against the Spanish right flank and Palombini against the Spanish left center near Mislata. But the main attack looped around Blake's extreme left flank at Riba-roja de Túria. Palombini mounted a serious attack on the Spanish entrenchments and his soldiers suffered significant losses. Blake became convinced that Palombini was the most dangerous threat. Meanwhile, Suchet's main attack rolled up Blake's left with very little opposition. Most of the Spanish left flank units fled to the south. By the late afternoon, Harispe on Suchet's right flank joined hands with Habert on the left, trapping Blake and 17,000 Spanish soldiers within Valencia. Palombini's division lost 50 killed and 355 wounded, which accounted for the bulk of Suchet's 521 casualties during the operation. The Siege of Valencia ended on 9 January 1812 when Blake surrendered. On 31 December, Palombini's division counted 3,591 officers and men.

=== Peninsular War: 1812–1813 ===
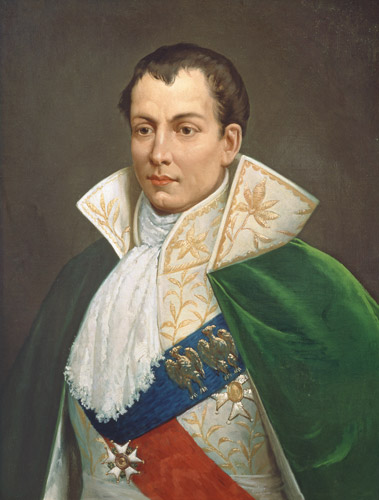
Joseph Bonaparte

Following orders from Napoleon, Palombini's division began marching to southern Aragon on 15 February 1812. The division was soon assigned, together with two other divisions to a corps under Reille. Palombini began sending out small anti-guerilla columns around Teruel, but on 5 and 28 March his troops suffered defeats. Having learned not to risk small forces, he massed his troops, but was unable to stop the guerillas from operating. Early in July, King Joseph Bonaparte tried to assemble a force to help Marshal Auguste de Marmont's army. He ordered Palombini to march to Madrid and the Italian promptly did so, even though Suchet was his immediate superior. After a forced march of 150 miles (241 km), Palombini's division arrived at Madrid exactly on the day predicted. Unfortunately for Joseph, it was too late; Marmont was badly defeated in the Battle of Salamanca on 25 July. Palombini's troops were in support of Anne-François-Charles Trelliard's cavalry on 11 August during the Battle of Majadahonda. On 15 October 1812, Palombini's division numbered 142 officers and 3,050 men, divided between the 2nd Light, 4th Line and 6th Line Infantry Regiments, plus the Napoleone Dragoons and two artillery batteries.

By an edict of 4 January 1813, many Imperial regiments in Spain were ordered to send home cadres enough to form one battalion. Most of the rank and file were transferred to the remaining field battalions. Palombini's division had to send back three battalion cadres. That month Palombini's division marched to join the Army of the North in order to replace a Young Guard brigade that was recalled to France. Palombini set up headquarters in Poza de la Sal and sent out foraging columns to find food. On the night of 10–11 February, Spanish troops under Francisco de Longa surprised the 500 Italians in the town. Rallying his men, Palombini held out until morning when his outlying columns returned and Longa's men slipped away. The Italian division reached Bilbao where they relieved the Young Guard on 21 February. From 25 January to 13 February, Palombini's division successfully cleared the highway between Burgos and Vitoria-Gasteiz. On 24 March near Castro Urdiales, Gabriel de Mendizábal Iraeta's 3,000–4,000 Spanish troops tried to surround Palombini's division, but were driven off. The Italians admitted sustaining 110 casualties but the real number was probably higher. The Italian division then brought supplies to the blockaded French garrison of Santoña. From there, Palombini's troops marched first to Bilbao then to Guernica where they unsuccessfully attacked a Spanish force on 2 April. After picking up some reinforcements, Palombini attacked Guernica on 5 April and this time drove off the Spanish.

On 10 April 1813, the Spanish attacked Bilbao. Its 2,000-man garrison barely held out until Palombini's division marched to the rescue. After a futile pursuit of the guerillas, the Italian division returned to Bilbao to wait for reinforcements. On 25 April, Maximilien Sébastien Foy set out with 11,000 soldiers including his own, Jacques Thomas Sarrut's and Palombini's divisions. By this time the Italian division had shrunk to 2,474 men in five battalions. Foy laid siege to Castro Urdiales, using his own division and three Italian battalions for the siege force. With the help of heavy cannons from Santoña, a gap of 60 feet (18 m) was blasted in the wall. In the evening of 11 May, eight Italian elite companies attacked the city gate while eight French elite companies assaulted the breach. Both rushes were successful, but the Royal Navy rescued most of the Spanish garrison while Foy's soldiers were plundering the city. Shortly afterward, Palombini was recalled to Italy. The division, reduced to a 1,500-man brigade, was led by Saint Paul during a short campaign that included the Battle of Tolosa on 26 June.

=== Italy: 1813–1814 ===
Palombini was given command of the 5th Italian Division under Viceroy Eugène de Beauharnais. On 7 September 1813, Gillot Rougier's (Ruggeri) 2,563-strong brigade from the 5th Division was defeated at Lipa in Croatia by a 2,100-man Austrian brigade under Laval Nugent von Westmeath. On 14 September at Jelšane, under the overall command of Pino, Palombini's division attacked Nugent's force but was unable to dislodge it. At nightfall, the Austrians finally retreated, having sustained 112 casualties and three dismounted cannons out of a total of 2,000 men and four guns. The Italians suffered 420 casualties out of 9,000 men and 12 guns, including Pino wounded. On 27 September at Cerknica, Palombini with 5,000 men and seven guns was defeated by Paul von Radivojevich with 4,000 Austrians and nine guns. The 5th Division included one battalion each of the 2nd Light and 1st Line Infantry, four battalions of the 2nd Line, three battalions of the 3rd Line, and two battalions of the Dalmatian Infantry Regiment. The Austrians captured 300 Italians, mostly from the 2nd Light. As a result of these and other actions, Eugène retreated west across the Isonzo River.

On 10 March 1814 there was a series of clashes between Mantua and Peschiera del Garda with Eugène's forces getting the worst of it. The Austrians lost 400 casualties while inflicting 2,000 casualties on the Franco-Italians. At Peschiera, Palombini with 2,000 troops was beaten by 3,000 Austrians, but losses were light on both sides. Palombini's force consisted of two brigades. Rougier's brigade included two battalions of the 3rd Light and four battalions of the 2nd Line. Livio Galimberti's brigade comprised three battalions of the 3rd Line, one battalion of the 6th Line, the Milan Guards Battalion and the Napoleone Dragoons. Near the end of the conflict, Palombini withdrew his division within Peschiera's fortress.

== Austrian Service ==
After the collapse of the Napoleonic Kingdom of Italy, Palombini entered the service of the Austrian Empire. On 2 July 1814 he accepted the rank of Feldmarschall-Leutnant. In 1815 during the Hundred Days he served on the Rhine against his former French allies. In 1816 received the Order of the Iron Crown, 2nd Class. In 1817 he was appointed Inhaber (proprietor) of the 36th Line Infantry Regiment, a Bohemian unit. The previous inhaber was Karl (Johann) Kollowrat-Krakowski and the succeeding one was Franz Furst zu Colloredo-Mannsfeld in 1850. Palombini retired from active service on 1824. He received the Prussian Order of the Red Eagle, 1st Class in 1846. He died at his wife's castle at Grochowice on 25 April 1850. Carolina had bought the estate in 1821. Their eldest son Giuseppe Camillo Palombini became a captain in the Austrian army.

== See also ==
- Mila, Leszek (2017). "Joseph Friedrich (Giuseppe Federico) Freiherr von Palombini., Baron" (in Polish). geni.com. According to this website, Palombini participated in the Invasion of Naples (1806), led a cavalry regiment at the Battle of Bailén, and took part in the campaign against Wellington after the Siege of Burgos. Unfortunately, there is no reliable source given, so none of these events are mentioned in the article.

Military offices
Preceded by Johann Kollowrat	Proprietor (Inhaber) of Infantry Regiment Nr. 36; 1817–1850	Succeeded by Franz Fürst zu Colloredo-Mannsfeld
