= Battle of Saguntum =

1811 battle during the Peninsular War

- Part of Peninsular War
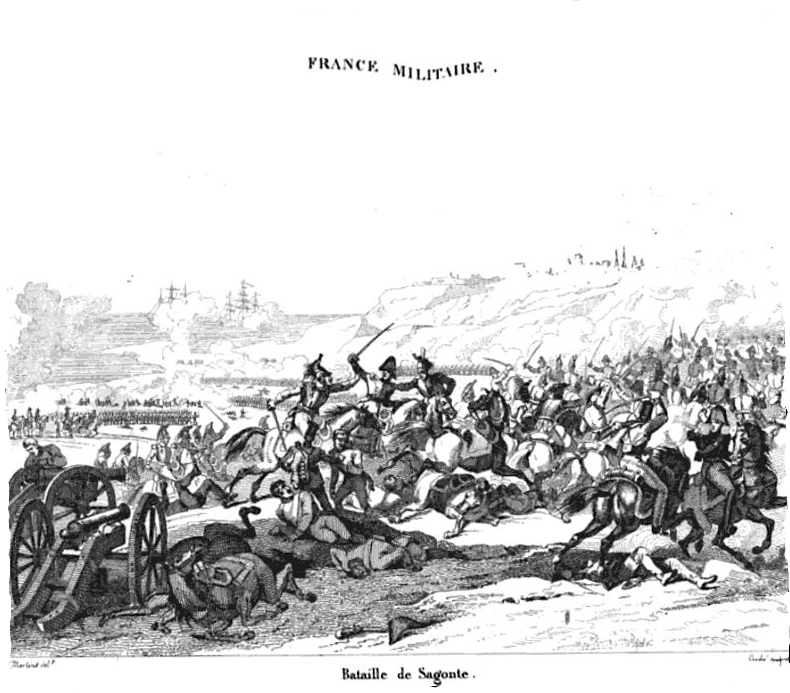
- Battle of Saguntum
Date	25 October 1811
Location	Sagunto, Spain 39.6833°N 0.2667°W
Result	French-allied victory

Belligerents
(France) French Empire (Kingdom of Italy (Napoleonic)) Kingdom of Italy (Poland) Duchy of Warsaw; Kingdom of Naples	Kingdom of Spain

Commanders and leaders
(France) Marshal Suchet (Kingdom of Italy (Napoleonic)) Giuseppe Palombini (Poland) Józef Chłopicki (Kingdom of Naples) Claude Compère	(Spain) Joaquín Blake (Spain) Charles O'Donnell (Spain) Nicolás de Mahy y Romo (Spain) Miguel Lardizabal y Uribe (Spain) Luis Andriani (Spain) Edmundo O'Ronan (Spain) José Obispo

Strength
14,000–20,000	Blake: 23,000–36,000; Andriani: 2,663–3,000

Casualties and losses
Battle: 1,000; Siege: 420–1,000	Battle: 5,700–6,000; Siege: 2,663–3,000

Peninsular War: Aragón Catalonia
current battle

The Battle of Saguntum (25 October 1811) saw the Imperial French Army of Aragon under Marshal Louis Gabriel Suchet fighting a Spanish army led by Captain General Joaquín Blake. The Spanish attempt to raise the siege of the Sagunto Castle failed when the French, Italians, and Poles drove their troops off the battlefield in rout. The action took place during the Peninsular War, part of the Napoleonic Wars. Sagunto lies a short distance from the east coast of Spain, about 30 kilometres (19 mi) north of Valencia.

Suchet invaded the province of Valencia in September 1811. He tried to quickly seize Sagunto Castle, but its garrison under Colonel Luis Andriani repulsed two attacks and the French-Allied army was forced to lay siege to the ancient fortress. When Blake's army advanced from Valencia to raise the siege, Suchet posted his somewhat smaller army to resist the Spanish. Blake's attack on Suchet's right flank went awry and soon the poorly trained Spanish troops were fleeing. The Spanish troops attacking Suchet's left flank were made of sterner stuff, however, and the contest there was more severe. Finally, the Imperial troops gained the upper hand and put almost the entire Spanish army to flight. The garrison of Sagunto Castle soon surrendered and Blake's soldiers limped back to Valencia where they tried to put that city's defences in order.

== Background ==
=== Armies ===
Under the command of Louis Gabriel Suchet, the French Army of Aragon successfully concluded the Siege of Tortosa on 2 January 1811 and the Siege of Tarragona on 29 June 1811. In the latter operation, the French killed or captured 15,000 Spanish troops, wiping out two-thirds of Catalonia's army. French losses were 4,300 killed and wounded. Tarragona's capture earned Suchet his marshal's baton. Emperor Napoleon desired to subjugate the Province of Valencia, but that campaign had to wait until the French recaptured the Sant Ferran Castle, which sat on a major road between France and Spain. The Siege of Figueras ended on 19 August 1811 with a Spanish surrender. Six days afterward, Napoleon ordered Suchet to advance and seize Valencia. The emperor assumed that the Spanish Army of Valencia was in a panic and that the city would be easy prey for the Imperial French army. Napoleon erred; Sagunto Castle would hold out for weeks.

According to historian Charles Oman, the Valencian Army had the "worst fighting reputation" of all the Spanish armies. During the campaign which ended with the fall of Tarragona, the army proved incapable of assisting the garrison. In October 1811 the army numbered 36,000 men, including the Reserve Division consisting of newly raised 3rd Battalions of old regiments. The 3rd Battalions suffered from having too few officers. The only first-class formations were the divisions of Major Generals Miguel Lardizabal y Uribe and José Pascual de Zayas y Chacón, veterans of the Battle of Albuera. When Blake took command of the Army of Valencia, he brought with him from Cádiz these two divisions. It was hoped that the Army of Murcia under Lieutenant General Nicolás de Mahy y Romo might help defend Valencia from Suchet's expected attack.

Marshal Suchet's Army of Aragon counted 50,000 troops, but after deducting garrisons and sick there were only 31,000 men available in the field. There were also 15,000 soldiers in the divisions of Generals of Division Honoré Charles Reille and Filippo Severoli in Navarre and western Aragon. These good troops would soon be assigned to Suchet's command. General of Division Charles Mathieu Isidore Decaen's French Army of Catalonia numbered 23,000 soldiers. However, because the Catalan miquelets were so active, not a single man could be spared from Decaen's force. Suchet assigned the division of General of Division Bernard-Georges-François Frère, 7,000 men, to protect his rearward communications. Suchet carefully selected 22,000 of his best infantry for the Valencian campaign, leaving 6,800 of his least effective men to garrison his supply line. The only problematic element of the Imperial French field army were the 1,500 Neapolitans under General of Division Claude Antoine Compère. Suchet's invading army included nearly all his available cavalry and field artillery.

=== Operations ===
The army commanders

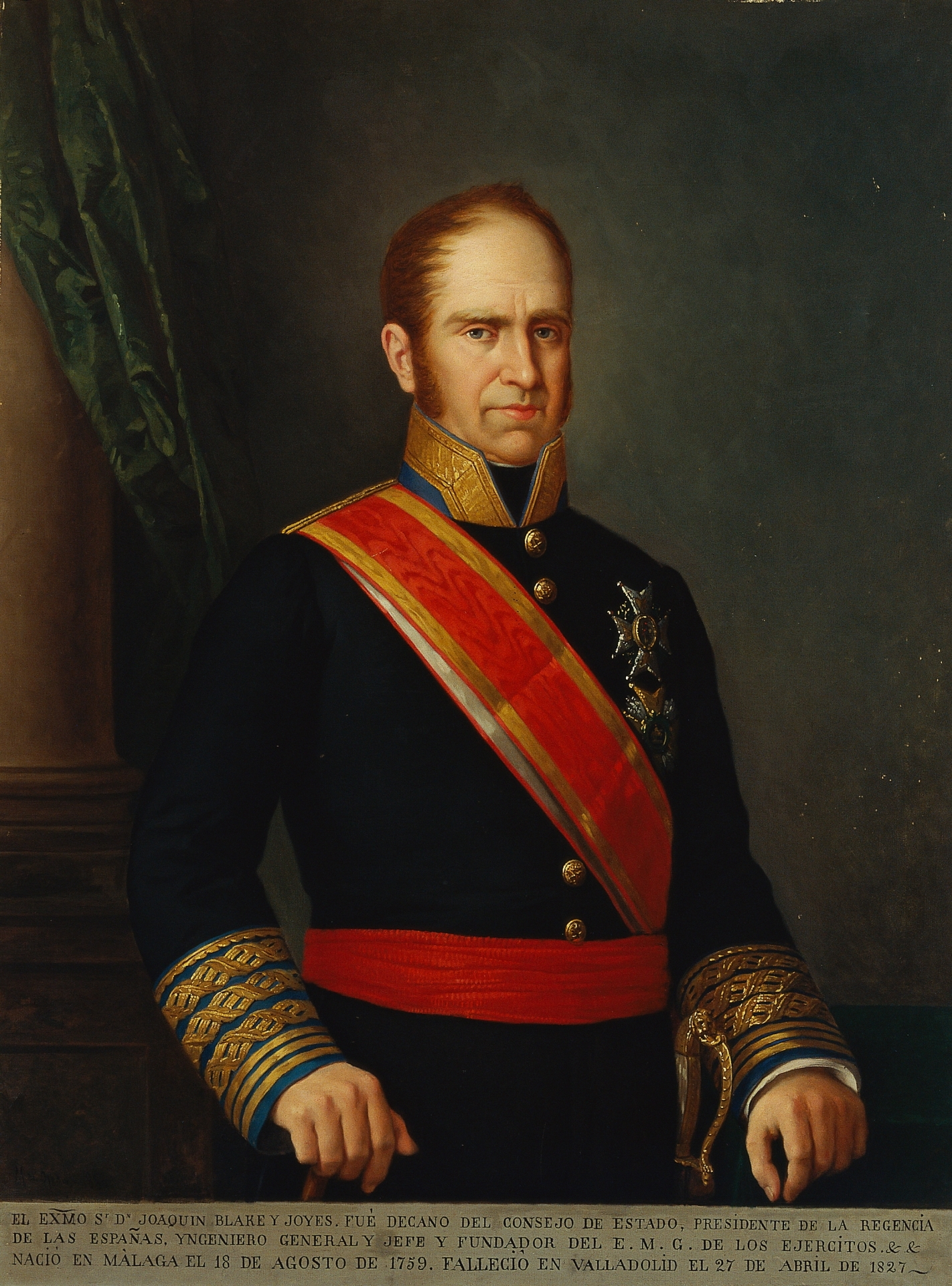
General Joaquín Blake

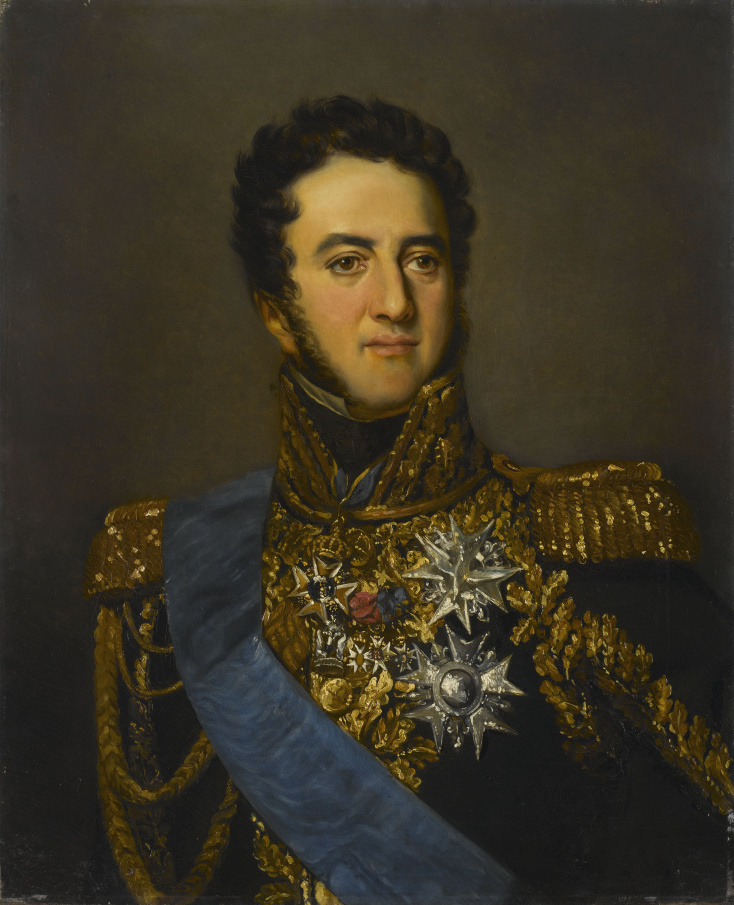
Marshal of the Empire Louis Gabriel Suchet

Suchet's left column advanced southwest along the coast road from Tortosa, where the French siege train and the bulk of the stores were kept. In the 11,000-strong coastal column, were General of Division Pierre-Joseph Habert's French infantry division, General of Brigade Louis Benoît Robert's infantry brigade from General of Division Louis François Félix Musnier's French division, almost all the cavalry and all the field artillery. General of Brigade Florentin Ficatier's brigade from Musnier's division accompanied the slow-moving siege guns. Musnier did not join the expedition; instead, he commanded the garrisons guarding the French supply line. The center column moved south on the mountain road via Alcañiz and Morella. The 7,000-man column consisted of General of Division Giuseppe Federico Palombini's Italian infantry division and Compère's Neapolitans. The right column marched southeast on the mountain road from Teruel and comprised 5,000 men from General of Division Jean Isidore Harispe's French infantry division. Harispe faced the greatest danger because his troops were nearest to Blake's Spanish army.

As it happened, Blake resigned himself to a passive defense from the beginning. Instead he urged his soldiers to construct a fortified and entrenched line covering Valencia. About twenty miles to the north of Valencia at Sagunto, Blake ordered a powerful fortress to be built. In March 1810, the abandoned site contained only the hilltop ruins of the Roman city of Saguntum which was later occupied by the Moors. On the recommendation of the British officer Charles William Doyle, Spanish workers restored the old walls by filling the gaps with stone blocks from the ancient ruins. The Roman theater, relatively intact up to this time, was dismantled to provide building materials. However, the work was still unfinished when Suchet's army advanced. The fortress was manned by 2,663 soldiers under the command of Colonel Andriani. There were five battalions, including two newly raised 3rd Battalions. The garrison had 17 cannons of which only three were 12-pounders and the rest lighter pieces. The Spanish also garrisoned Peniscola with 1,000 soldiers and Oropesa del Mar with 500 more.

On 15 September, all three Imperial French columns began to move. Two days later, Suchet's left column bypassed Peniscola, leaving one battalion and some hussars to keep an eye on the place. On 19 September, the French coastal column threaded past the two defended towers near Oropesa. That evening, Palombini's center column joined the left column, having encountered no opposition along its route. Blake sent General José Obispo's division to block Harispe's column at the Barraques pass. Harispe detected the Spanish force and took a side road to the east to avoid Obispo. This French division marched down the valley of the Mijares River to the coast to join the other two columns. On 22 September, Suchet's entire army set out from Castellón de la Plana, brushing aside 500 Spanish troops at Villarreal and the next day was before Sagunto Castle.

== Siege ==
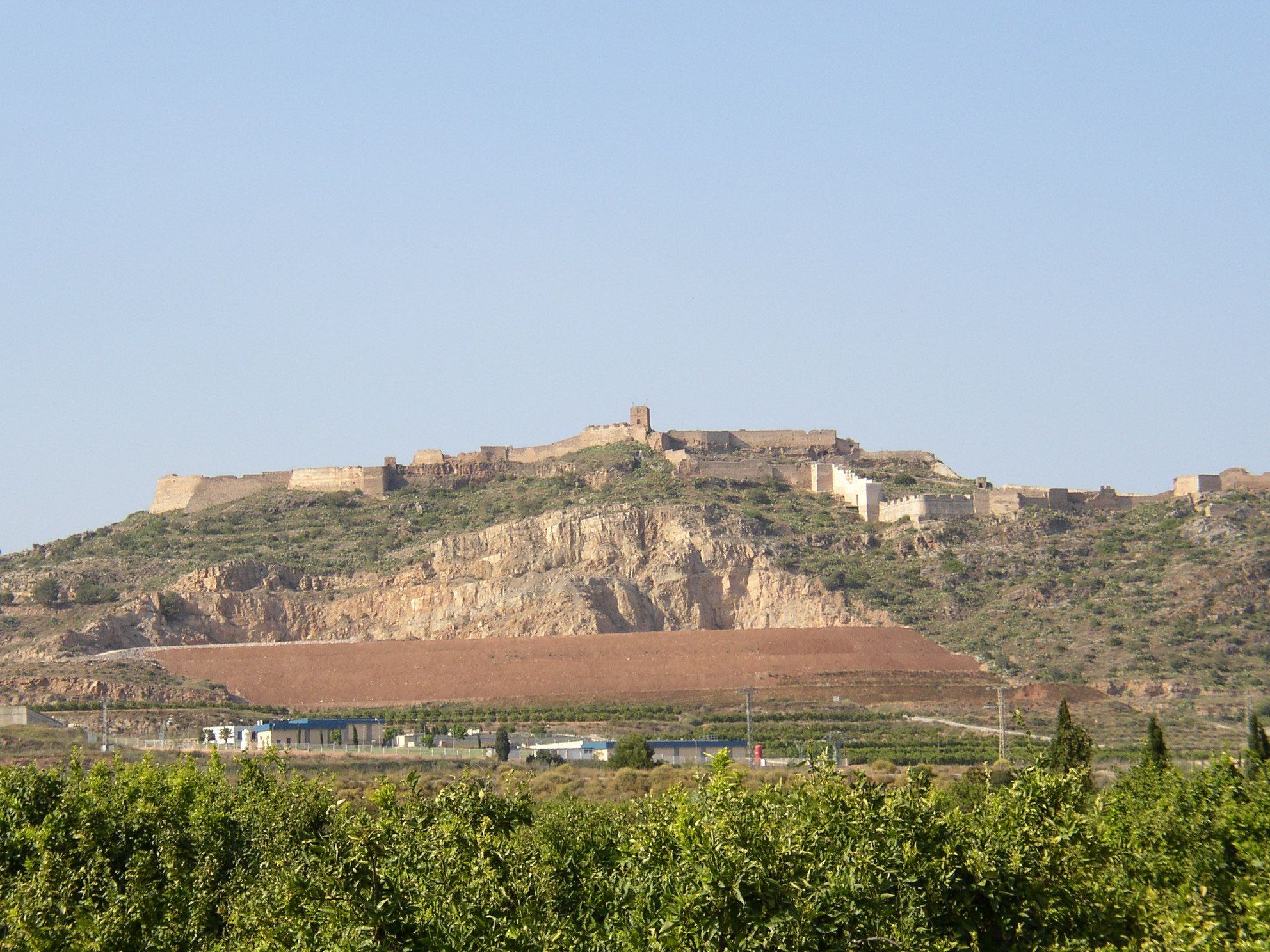
Sagunto (Saguntum) Castle

On 23 September, the Imperial French army invested Sagunto Castle by sending Habert's division around its east side and Harispe's division around its west side. Suchet's cavalry swept the country south to within 6 miles (10 km) of Valencia without meeting significant opposition. Palombini's division hovered off to the northwest to intercept any Spanish attempt to trouble the siege. Seeing that the castle's defenses were incomplete and two gaps in the wall were visible, Suchet decided to try a coup de main at midnight on 27–28 September. Two columns, each of 300 men were formed of volunteers from Habert's division. A third supporting column of similar size was assembled in the town of Murviedro at the base of the castle hill. Habert held 2,000 men ready to support a breakthrough. To mislead the defenders, six companies of Palombini's Italians would mount a diversion against another part of the fortress. Suchet hoped that the assault would be a surprise.

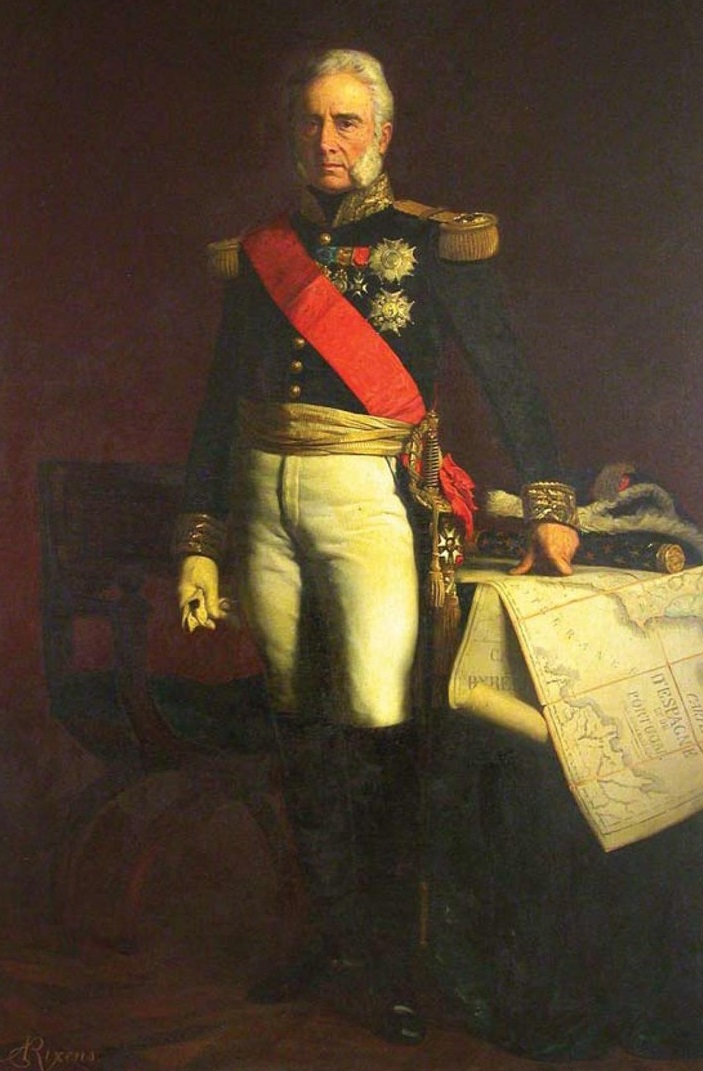
Jean Isidore Harispe

In the dark, the French storming parties crept forward into a large cistern which was near the old Roman theater. At this point they were 120 yards (110 m) from the two gaps. By some accident, firing broke out and the storming columns burst from cover prematurely, only to find the Spanish defenders alert. The attackers were able to plant a number of ladders against the wall, but the Spanish troops fought with desperate courage. Every Frenchman who got to the top of the wall was killed and the ladders knocked down. The French bravely pressed forward but their opponents stoutly held their positions. At midnight Palombini's men launched their diversion, which was met by sharp musketry. However, this did not cause the garrison to transfer troops away from the main attack. The third column was committed to the main assault, but this effort also failed. Finally, the survivors pulled back behind cover. At length, Suchet authorized the storming columns to retreat. The marshal admitted losses of 247 killed and wounded, though another source claimed that 360 men were casualties, including 52 Italians. Spanish losses were only 15 killed and fewer than 30 wounded.

After this failure, Suchet ordered Ficatier's brigade and the siege guns to join him. On their slow journey from Tortosa, the heavy guns would first need to blast the two Oropesa towers into submission. The French marshal divided his army into a blockade force to surround Sagunto Castle and a covering force to defend against Spanish interference. While waiting for the siege guns, the French engineering troops began to prepare battery positions and ramps to get their guns up the hill. Blake did not trust his soldiers to fight in the open field against Suchet's veteran army. Mahy, who commanded the Murcian army, complained that his troops had no confidence in their fighting abilities. In this situation, Blake hoped to force Suchet to retreat by cutting his supply line. He sent Obispo's division to Segorbe where it blocked the road from Teruel. The main effort against Suchet's communications was made by the guerillas.

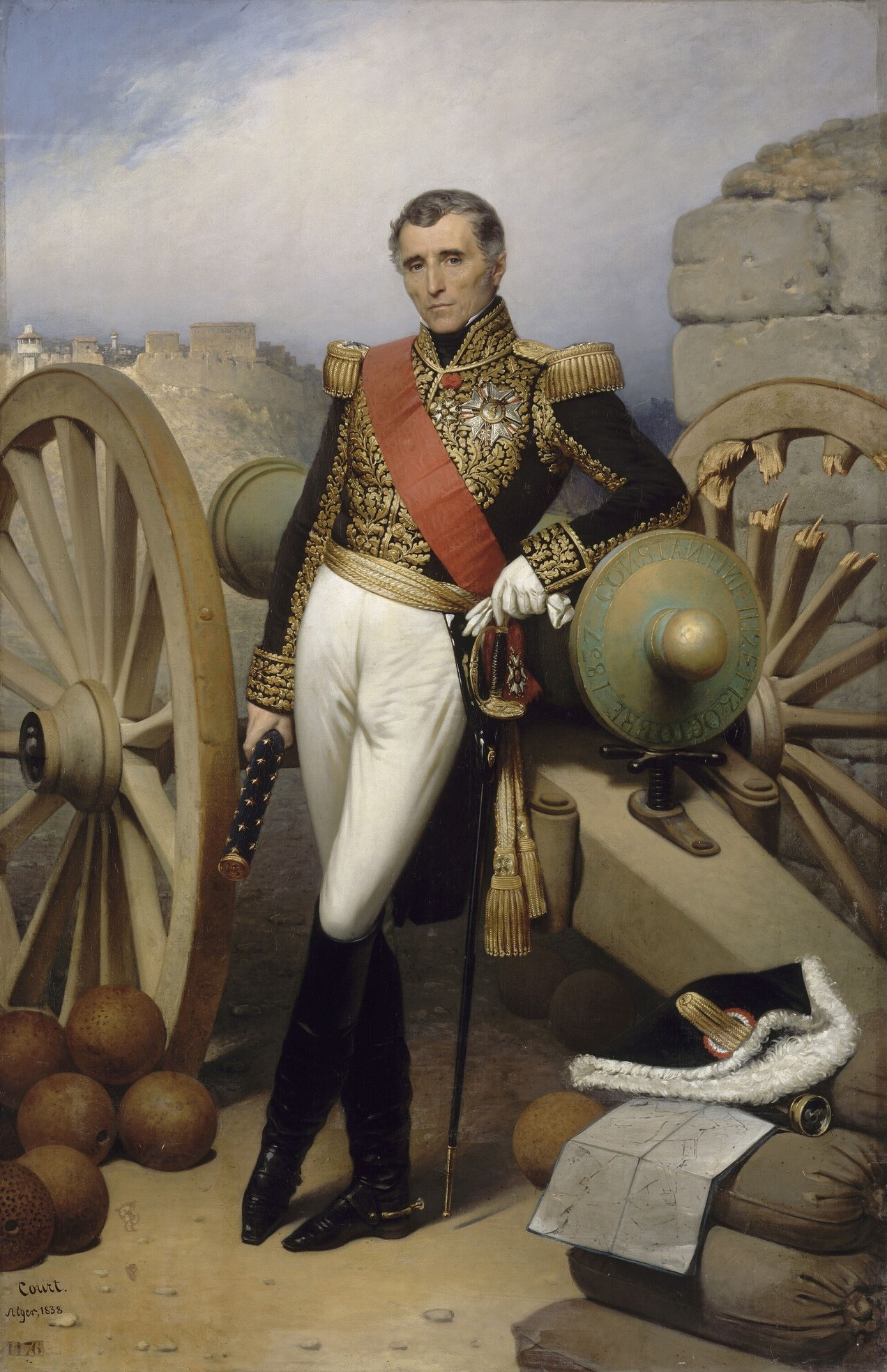
Sylvain Charles Valée

Juan Martín Díez, José Durán and their guerilla bands attacked Calatayud, forcing its Franco-Italian defenders into a fortified convent. Martín's guerillas drove off a 1,000-strong relief column and then the Spanish forced the 560 survivors to surrender on 3 October 1811 by exploding two mines under the walls. At this time, Severoli's 7,000-strong Italian division reinforced the Imperial occupation forces of Aragon, restoring their shaken confidence. Francisco Espoz y Mina with 4,000 guerillas besieged Ejea de los Caballeros, forcing its garrison to cut its way out and join an 800-man relief column led by Colonel Ceccopieri. Not realizing Mina's strength, Ceccopieri marched his battalion of the 7th Italian Line Infantry Regiment to the relief of Ayerbe. On 16 October, Mina ambushed the Italians, killing 200 soldiers and their commander, and capturing the 600 survivors. Mina then herded his prisoners to Mutriku on the northern coast and handed them over to the frigate HMS Iris. Nevertheless, these minor disasters failed to distract Suchet from his siege of Saguntum.

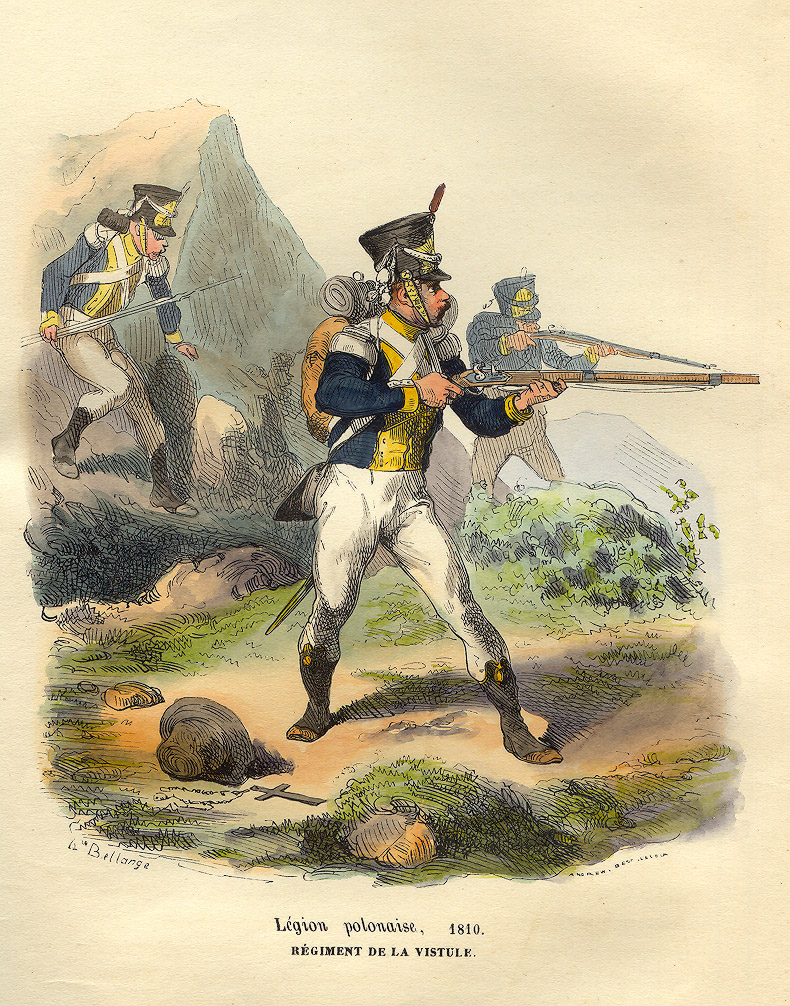
Poles of the Legion of the Vistula

Blake made a few more ineffectual attempts to interfere with the siege. Suchet sent Palombini's division and Robert's brigade to chase Obispo's division out of Segorbe, which was easily done. On 2 October Harispe's division and Robert's brigade drove Lieutenant General Charles O'Donnell's troops out of Benaguasil, inflicting 400 casualties on the Spanish troops while sustaining about 60 casualties. Hearing a rumor that French troops were approaching from Madrid, Blake sent Mahy's Murcians on a fruitless march to Cuenca where they found only one enemy battalion, which got away. On 10 October, Suchet's siege guns reached Oropesa where they forced the surrender of 215 Spanish soldiers in the first tower. The next day, the troops in the second tower were evacuated by the ship-of-the-line HMS Magnificent (74). On 12 October the much-needed siege train reached Sagunto Castle. Ficatier's brigade was spread out to defend Segorbe, Oropesa and Almenara.

Generals of Division Sylvain Charles Valée and Joseph Rogniat, Suchet's artillery and engineering commanders respectively, arrived with the siege train. It took Suchet's troops four days to drag the heavy guns up the hill and into battery. Because the hill was rocky, the Imperial troops had to bring earth up from the bottom of the hill in order to build parapets. On 16 October, the siege guns opened fire and by the afternoon of the 18th the gunners and engineers reported that there was a breach in the Spanish defenses at the Dos Mayo redoubt. Suchet ordered an assault for that evening. The plan called for 400 men from Habert's division to lead the attack and to be supported by Palombini's Italians. The siege guns pounded the breach until the last minute, causing losses among the defenders, who bravely stood at their posts piling sandbags and other obstructions into the breach. At 5:00 pm, the men of the storming column rushed the defenses and made it halfway up the breach before being stopped by intense fire. The few French soldiers who clawed their way to the top were stabbed or shot. The assault was a complete failure and Habert soon ordered the men to fall back. Suchet admitted losing 173 casualties, but the real total was nearer 300.

After the repulse, Rogniat convinced Suchet to rely on siege methods. The defenders continued to fiercely resist and the French lost 15–20 men every day in their effort to push their works closer to the Spanish fortifications. Meanwhile, Blake again sent Obispo to seize Segorbe. Suchet countered this move by sending Palombini on 20 October with 4,500 Franco-Italian troops to clear the road to Teruel. By the 24th Palombini was back with Suchet's army. Returning from his useless excursion to Cuenca, Mahy joined Blake on 23 October and the next day Blake set out with his army to relieve Sagunto Castle. Blake's strategy of avoiding battle was deeply unpopular in Valencia and he needed to fight a battle or face being removed from his command.

== Battle ==
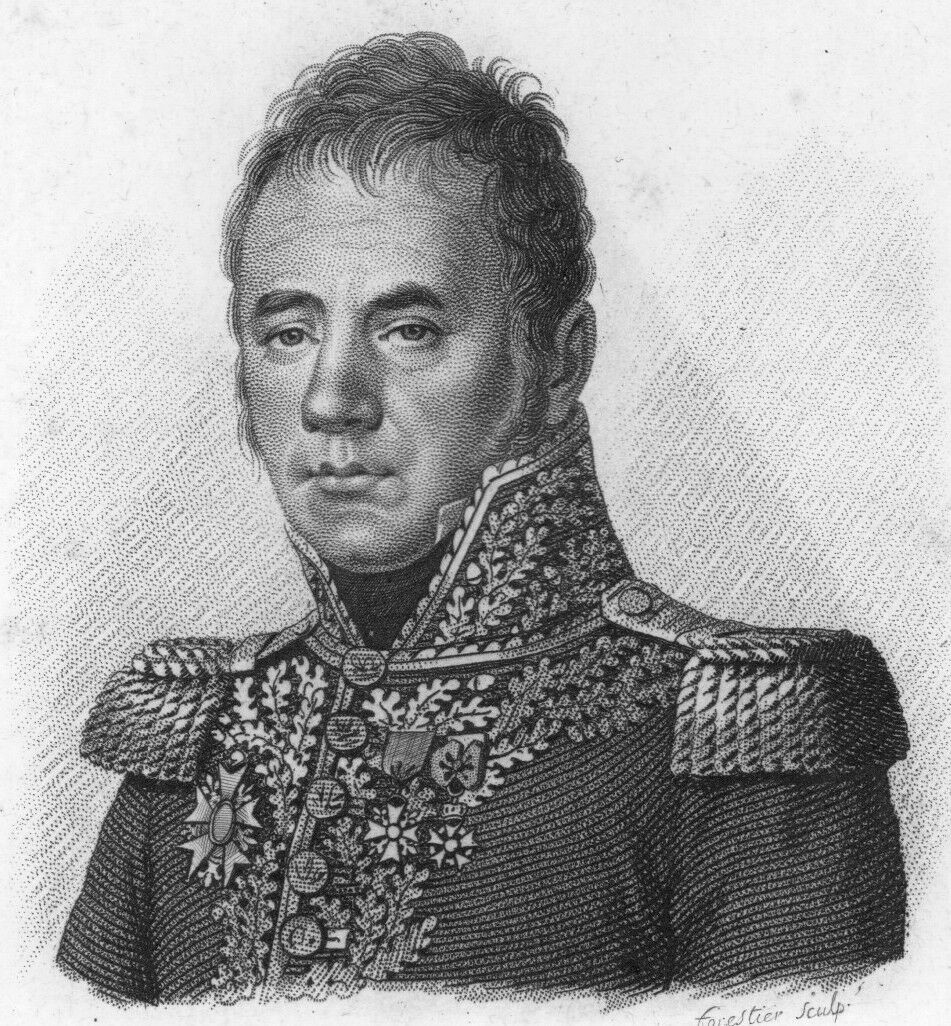
Pierre-Joseph Habert

Blake planned to attack and hold the Imperial French army with his right wing, while crushing the enemy right flank with the bulk of his army. The right wing's attack was led by the veteran infantry divisions of Zayas (2,500) and Lardizabal (3,000). These were supported by 3,500 foot soldiers of the Valencian Reserve under General Velasco, 300 horsemen under General Loy, 800 Valencian cavalry under General Caro and three batteries of artillery. Blake left wing consisted of the Valencian infantry divisions of Generals José Miranda (4,000) and Pedro Villacampa (3,350) and José Obispo (3,400), and Mahy's Murcian infantry brigades led by Generals Juan Creagh and Conde de Montijo (4,600 total). General San Juan led one brigade of 900 Valencian and a second brigade of 800 Murcian cavalry. There were 18 field guns in three batteries. O'Donnell planned to attack with Villacampa and Miranda, while Obispo came in on the Imperial right rear. Mahy and San Juan would support O'Donnell's attack, while two Murcian battalions under Colonel O'Ronan served as a link between Obispo and O'Donnell. Altogether, Blake would throw 10,500 troops against Suchet's left flank and 17,000 against his right flank.

Suchet maintained the siege of Sagunto Castle with the 117th Line Infantry Regiment from Habert's division and General of Brigade Éloi Charles Balathier's brigade from Palombini's division. Compère's Neapolitans watched the road to Segorbe, which runs to the northwest. Approximately 4,000 troops stayed in the siege lines. To face Blake's army, Suchet deployed 12,000 infantry, 1,800 cavalry and six batteries of field artillery, for a total of about 14,000 men. Though outnumbered nearly two to one, the French marshal was aware that his army was qualitatively superior to his opponent's army. Suchet posted Habert's division (2,500) on the left flank and Harispe's division (3,600) in the center. The reserve consisted of the 2,000 foot soldiers of General of Brigade Vertigier Saint Paul's Italian brigade and 1,300 cavalry. Guarding the right flank was Robert's brigade (2,500), Colonel Schiazzetti's Italian Napoleone Dragoon Regiment (450) and one artillery battery. At the last minute, Suchet switched the 44th Line (1,800) under General of Brigade Józef Chłopicki to the right flank. Chłopicki was senior to Robert, so the Pole assumed command of the right flank. Whereas the Imperial left and center were arrayed in the plain, the right flank lined the crests of the Sancti Espiritus Hills.

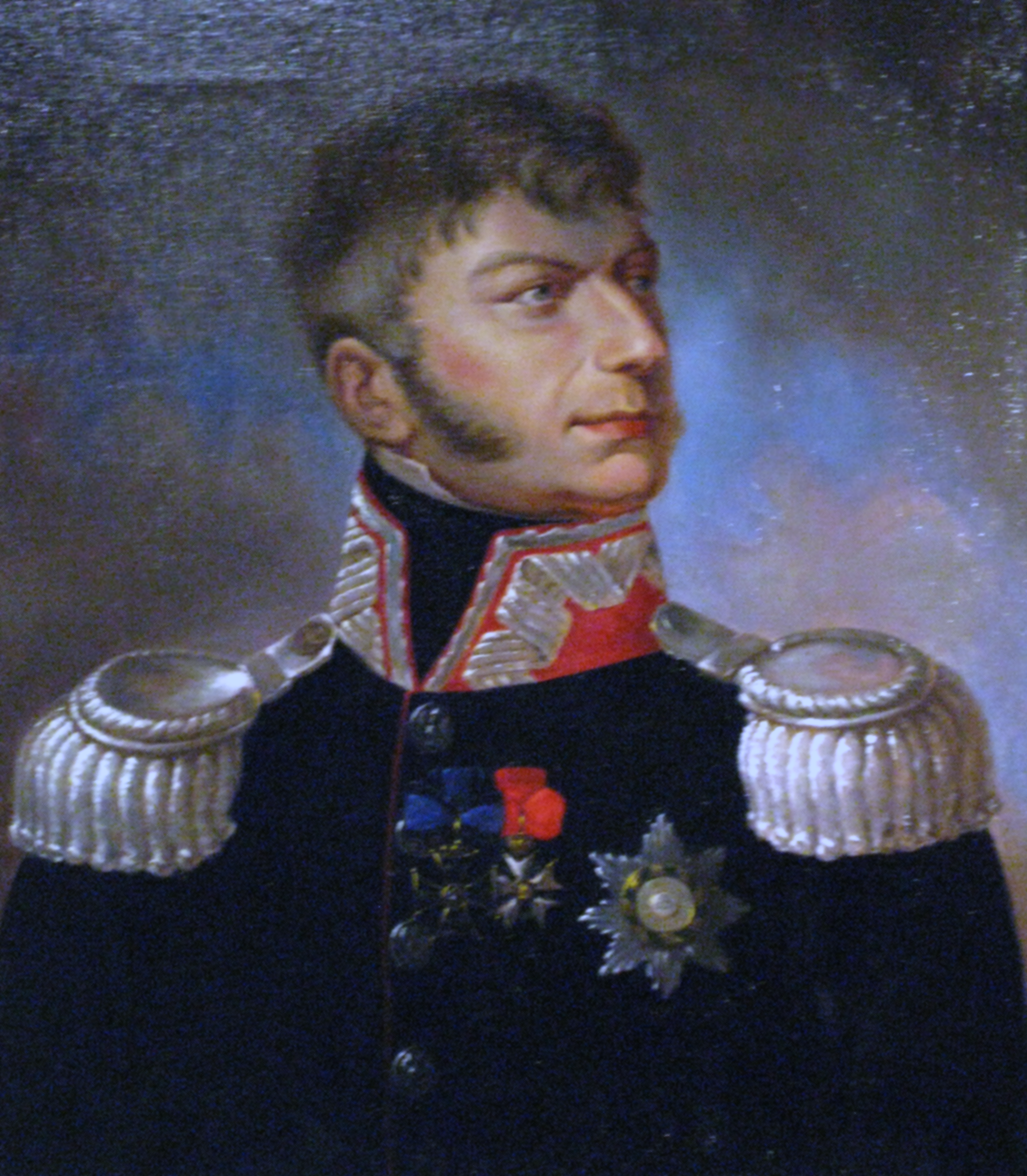
Józef Chłopicki

At about 7:00 am, O'Ronan's two battalions bumped into Robert's brigade and were repulsed. Next, O'Donnell's two divisions descended the Germanel Heights and moved to attack Chłopicki's troops. As they marched up the slopes of the Sancti Espritus Hills, Villacampa's division on the left was somewhat ahead of Miranda's division on the right. In second line were San Juan's cavalry and well to the rear on the Germanel Heights were Mahy's Murcian infantry. When the Spanish formations started to press back the Imperial skirmish line, Chłopicki ordered an attack. Robert's brigade came into contact with Villacampa's startled men first and pushed them to the bottom of the hill without much resistance. Between Robert's five battalions and the two battalions of the 44th Line stood Schiazzetti's dragoons. These horsemen charged downhill into the gap between the two Valencian divisions and then swerved into the left flank of Miranda's soldiers. Seeing Villacampa's division give way and the Italian dragoons boring in on their flank, Miranda's men turned and fled back to the valley. O'Donnell ordered San Juan's cavalry forward to protect his infantry. Recognizing a crisis, Mahy advanced his troops toward the action.

After his stunning success, Chłopicki halted his troops, waiting to see how matters were going on the Imperial center and left. By this time, O'Donnell's two divisions were seething masses at the bottom of the hill. Having reformed his dragoons, Schiazzetti launched them at San Juan's Valencian cavalry brigade. The hapless Spanish horsemen turned and galloped away, riding over the first two of Mahy's battalions as they appeared, causing them to run away also. At this, Chłopicki waved his seven battalions forward and O'Donnell's two divisions dissolved into complete rout. The Murcian cavalry brigade and two infantry brigades also collapsed. Mahy managed to form a rearguard from one battalion each of the Cuenca and Molina (Montijo's brigade and Villacampa's division, respectively) Infantry Regiments. The rest were scattering in panic-stricken flight. Spanish losses were only about 400 killed and wounded, but the Imperial troops rounded up about 2,000 prisoners and a few cannons. Obispo's division showed up too late. O'Ronan's battalions joined it and retreated to the north.

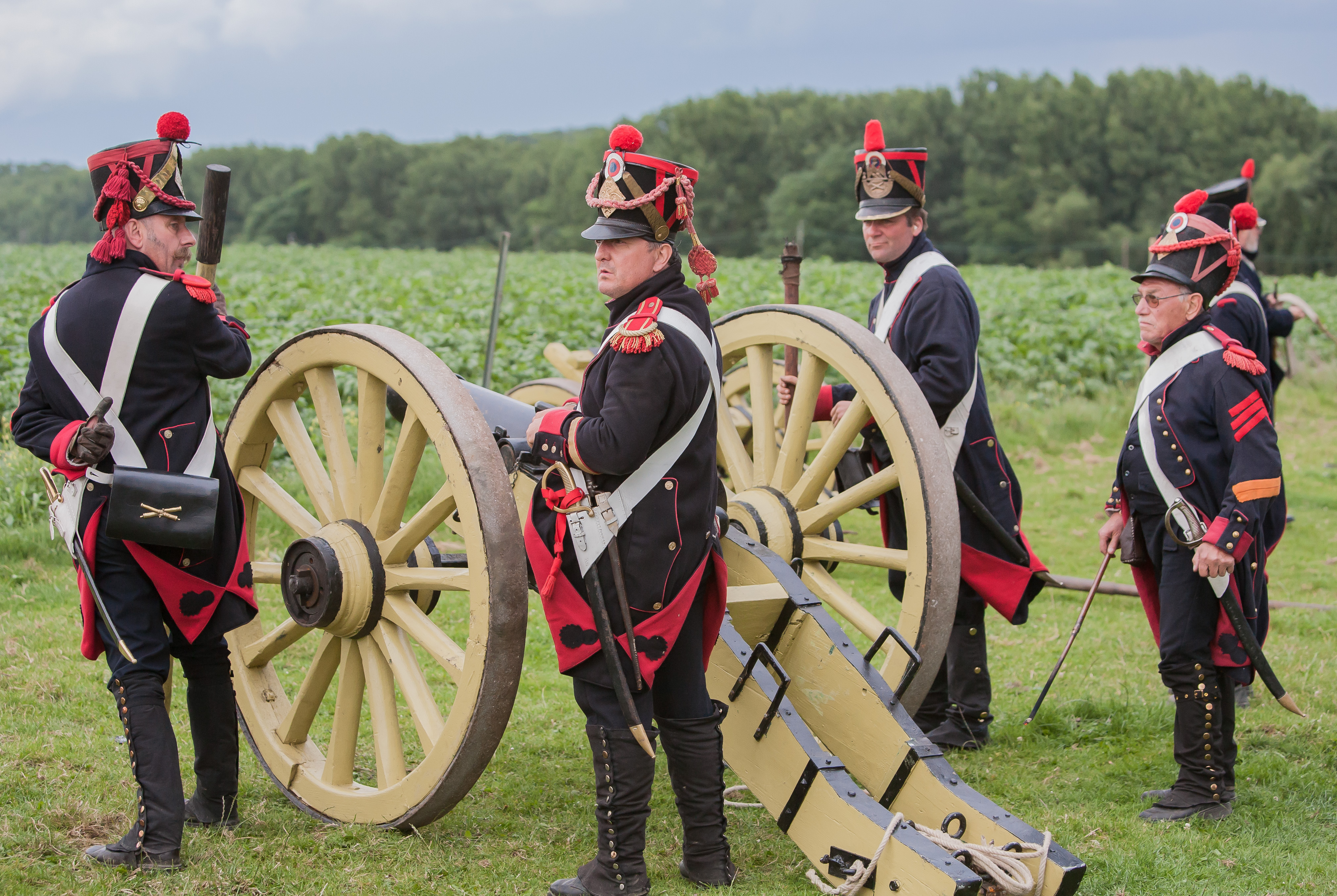
Battle of Waterloo re-enactors are dressed as French artillerymen.

While the fiasco on Blake's left was playing out, the Spanish right wing began its attack. Habert kept well away from the shoreline because there were several Spanish gunboats offshore, firing cannons. On the Spanish right flank, the division of Zayas advanced and got into a musketry duel with Habert's troops, with neither side gaining the advantage. In the center, both sides tried to occupy a knoll between the battle lines, but Ladizabal's leading brigade under General Prieto got there first. Prieto quickly deployed 1,500 soldiers and a battery of artillery to defend the knoll. Suchet organized an attack spearheaded by four battalions of the 7th Line Infantry. These were supported on each flank by the 116th Line and the Poles of the 3rd Legion of the Vistula, an example of the mixed order favored by Napoleon. Two squadrons of the 4th Hussars and one squadron of the 13th Cuirassiers covered Harispe's left flank. The Imperial attack forced Prieto's men to fall back from the knoll, but not before they inflicted heavy losses on their foes. General of Brigade Marie Auguste Paris was wounded and Harispe had his horse killed under him. Lardizabal got his second brigade and a second battery into action against Harispe's troops. Meanwhile, a French battery began blasting Lardizabal's right flank.

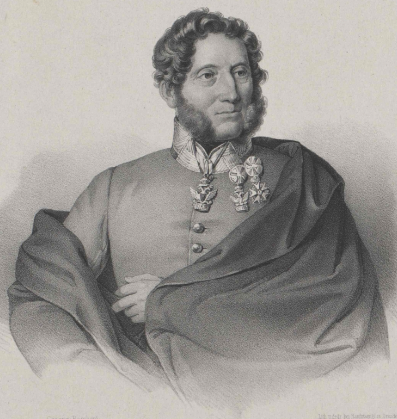
Giuseppe Palombini in Austrian service

Generals Loy and Caro brought 1,100 Spanish cavalry forward and charged. Partly masked by some trees, this unexpected attack fell on the three French squadrons on Harispe's left and routed them. Loy led his troopers to capture three cannons and nearly overran the 116th Line which barely had time to wheel back at an angle to protect the Imperial flank. Caro's horsemen galloped after the beaten French cavalry. In the crisis, Suchet ordered Palombini to send Saint Paul's brigade to plug the hole in the line. The French marshal then rode to the remaining two squadrons of the 13th Cuirassiers and ordered them to charge. The 350 cuirassiers crashed into the Spanish cavalry and scattered them. Both Loy and Caro bravely tried to rally their troopers; both were badly wounded and captured. The cuirassiers rode over a Spanish battery and were only stopped when they reached the Picador stream in the Spanish rear, where they were pounded by the guns attached to the Valencian Reserve. At this time, Lardizabal's division was still holding its own in a musketry fight with Harispe's soldiers.

Following in the wake of the cuirassiers, Saint Paul's Italians drove off the last of the Spanish horse, then came in on Lardizabal's unprotected right flank. Lardizabal's soldiers had performed very well, but the division finally crumbled under the pressure from front and flank. Blake had set up his command post and reserves too far to the rear to influence the battle. As one of his staff observed, Blake gave the initial order to advance and then let events take their course. When Lardizabal's troops gave way, Blake finally overcame his inertia and gave orders for his right wing to quickly retreat out of danger and began to organize a general withdrawal. Zayas was able to fend off Habert and get most of his troops across the Picador stream.

The Walloon Guard battalion from Zayas' division defended the village of Puzzol where they attracted the attention of Habert's division. After a stiff fight, 400 men of the battalion were captured, but this allowed the rest of Zayas' division to get away without further loss. Lardizabal's troops were not so lucky. After falling back, their general reformed the division alongside the Reserve. There was a lull in the battle during which Suchet reordered his regiments and ordered the rallied 4th Hussars to the right to help Chłopicki round up prisoners. Then Suchet unleashed his last regiment, the 24th Dragoons, directly down the main road. The dragoons rode into Lardizabal's survivors, broke up the last formed battalions and seized two cannons and four flags. The Imperial pursuit went on for 7 miles (11 km).

== Result ==
Blake's army lost about 1,000 killed and wounded, mostly in the veteran divisions of Zayas and Lardizabal. The French made 4,641 prisoners and captured 12 guns. The 2nd Regiment of Badajoz lost 17 officers and 521 men out of 800, mostly taken prisoner. Harispe and Habert lost 41 officer casualties while battling the two divisions of Spanish veterans. Chłopicki and Robert sustained only seven officer casualties. As usual, Suchet understated his losses at 130 killed and 590 wounded. Total Spanish casualties came to around 6,000. French losses were probably around 1,000 killed and wounded.

The next day, Suchet sent an emissary to Andriani, asking for the garrison's surrender. Andriani soon gave in. After seeing the army of relief dispersed before their eyes, the troops of the garrison had no more stomach for a siege. By this time, the French siege trenches were very close to the Spanish defenses. The Dos Mayo redoubt was in ruins from the bombardment and would probably have fallen to the next assault. The 2,500 survivors became French prisoners, though 200 of them were too sick or injured to be moved from the hospital. Most of the 17 guns were knocked out and their ammunition was low, though there were enough musket cartridges to prolong the defense.

Suchet might have advanced to Valencia and scattered the 22,000 survivors of Blake's demoralized army. Instead, the French marshal paused after his victory. After providing a garrison for Sagunto Castle and detaching a brigade to escort the Spanish prisoners to the rear, he had only 15,000 men available for field operations. Suchet declined to use Ficatier's brigade because it secured the roads over which his food and supplies reached him. He wanted the divisions of Severoli and Reille for the advance to Valencia. Severoli was under his orders, but that general's troops guarded Aragon. To procure Reille's help Suchet needed Napoleon's permission. That consent would arrive only in December.

== Notes ==
Preceded by Battle of Usagre	Napoleonic Wars; Battle of Saguntum	Succeeded by Battle of Arroyo dos Molinos
