= Juan de Courten (younger) =

Spanish general

- Born: 9 July 1765; Barcelona
- Died: 26 May 1834 (aged 68) Madrid
- Allegiance: Kingdom of Spain
- Branch: Infantry
- Rank: Mariscal de campo
- Conflicts: Peninsular War; Siege of Tortosa; Siege of Tarragona
- Other work: Royal and Military Order of Saint Hermenegild, 1818

Juan de Courten (younger) (1765–1834) was a Spanish general who led an infantry division during the Peninsular War against the First French Empire. In 1810, he was promoted to mariscal de campo, a Spanish rank between brigadier general and lieutenant general, and therefore equivalent to major general. The following year he was captured at the conclusion of the Siege of Tarragona. In 1818, he received an important military decoration.

== Career ==
Courten was appointed mariscal de campo, which is roughly the same as a major general in 1810. On 10 December 1810, the Army of Catalonia consisted of Courten's 4,791-man division, Pedro Sarsfield's 5,462-strong division, Joaquín Ibáñez Cuevas y de Valonga, Baron de Eroles' 2,538-man division, and 13,040 soldiers in various garrisons. The army commander, Luis González Torres de Navarra, Marquess of Campoverde received word from a Spanish official in Barcelona that a French officer was ready to admit a force into one of the forts. Accordingly, Campoverde marched Courten's and Sarsfield's divisions close to the city on 19 March 1811. A force of 800 grenadiers was assembled and sent silently forward to surprise the Monjuich fortress. As the Spanish soldiers entered the ditch, the area was suddenly lit by torches and the French garrison opened fire. Spanish losses numbered 100 killed and wounded, plus four officers and a number of enlisted men captured. The Frenchman had only pretended to betray his country, allowing the trap to be sprung on the hapless Spanish soldiers. The Spanish official was executed immediately afterward.

On 28 April, Marshal Louis Gabriel Suchet advanced from Lérida with the divisions of Jean Isidore Harispe and Bernard-Georges-François Frère. The French reached Reus on 2 May and pushed back the Spanish outpost line around Tarragona the next day. With his 4,500 men and the garrison troops, Courten could muster only 7,000 men for the city's defense. In the face of Suchet's superior force he intelligently immured himself within the city. At this time, his division consisted of three battalions of the Granada Line Infantry Regiment, and two battalions each of the Almanza, Almeria, and America Line Infantry Regiments.

Tarragona was a very strong position, but its walls were too long for soldiers immediately available to defend it. The walls enclosed both the upper and lower towns. The upper town stood on a steep hill while the lower town had access to a good harbor. The lower town was protected by six bastions and the upper town had an outer line of forts in front of the walls. On a dominating height 800 yards (732 m) to the north was the powerful Fort Olivo, defended by 1,000 troops. The division of Pierre-Joseph Habert soon arrived with the French heavy artillery and the Siege of Tarragona began. Harispe's division faced Fort Olivo and the east side of the city, Habert took position on the west side facing the lower town, while Frère covered the center. An Anglo-Spanish naval squadron under Edward Codrington consisting of two third-rates, two frigates, and gunboats stood offshore to provide logistic and gunfire support. On 10 May Campoverde arrived by ship with 4,000 troops to take over the defense.

On 28 June, French troops led by Habert stormed into the upper city and beat down all opposition. Contreras was wounded and captured. As the disaster unfolded, Courten with 3,000 troops tried to implement the breakout plan and emerged from the eastern gate of the city. As his soldiers made their way along the shore, they were blocked by an Italian brigade and set upon by French cavalry. A number of soldiers jumped into the water and were rescued by ship's boats from the naval squadron. Others were cut down by the horsemen but most surrendered with Courten. Of his original division, only 1,793 men survived the siege to be captured by the French. Suchet recorded the prisoners as follows, 613 from Almanza, 464 from Almeria, 365 from Granada, and 351 from America.

In 1818, King Ferdinand VII of Spain awarded Courten the Caballeros Grandes Cruces (Knight's Grand Cross) of the Royal and Military Order of Saint Hermenegild.
