= Juan de Courten =

Juan de Courten may refer to:

- Juan de Courten (elder) (1730–1796), Spanish general
- Juan de Courten (younger) (fl. 1810s), Spanish general
