= Battle of Mollet =

1810 battle during the Peninsular War

- Part of the Peninsular War
Date	21 January 1810
Location	Mollet del Vallès, Catalonia, Spain 41.5394°N 2.2133°E
Result	Spanish victory

Belligerents
(France) French Empire	Kingdom of Spain

Commanders and leaders
(France) Guillaume Philibert Duhesme	(Spain) Marquess of Campoverde

Strength
2,160	3,000

Casualties and losses
700 dead or wounded 640 captured 2 cannons	Unknown

Peninsular War: Aragón Catalonia
current battle

The Battle of Mollet or the Action of Mollet took place at Mollet del Vallès, near Barcelona, in Catalonia, on 21 January 1810, between a force of 2,160 French soldiers commanded by General Guillaume Philibert Duhesme and a Spanish force of 3,000 men under Luis González Torres de Navarra, Marquess of Campoverde. The Spanish Division of Llobregat led by Campoverde intercepted and destroyed the French vanguard (500 men) at Santa Perpètua de Mogoda. Then, the Spanish marched to Mollet to face the rest of Duhesme forces (1,500 regulars, 160 cuirassiers and 2 cannons). The French were surrounded by the Spanish force and finally, after a vigorous defense, the French surrendered. The Spanish captured 500 French soldiers, 140 cuirassiers, 2 cannons, and the baggage. Duhesme and the rest of his force fled to Granollers, and were saved from other Spanish attack thanks to the arrival of Marshal Pierre Augereau with 9,000 men.
