= Combat of Cardona =

1810 battle during the Peninsular War

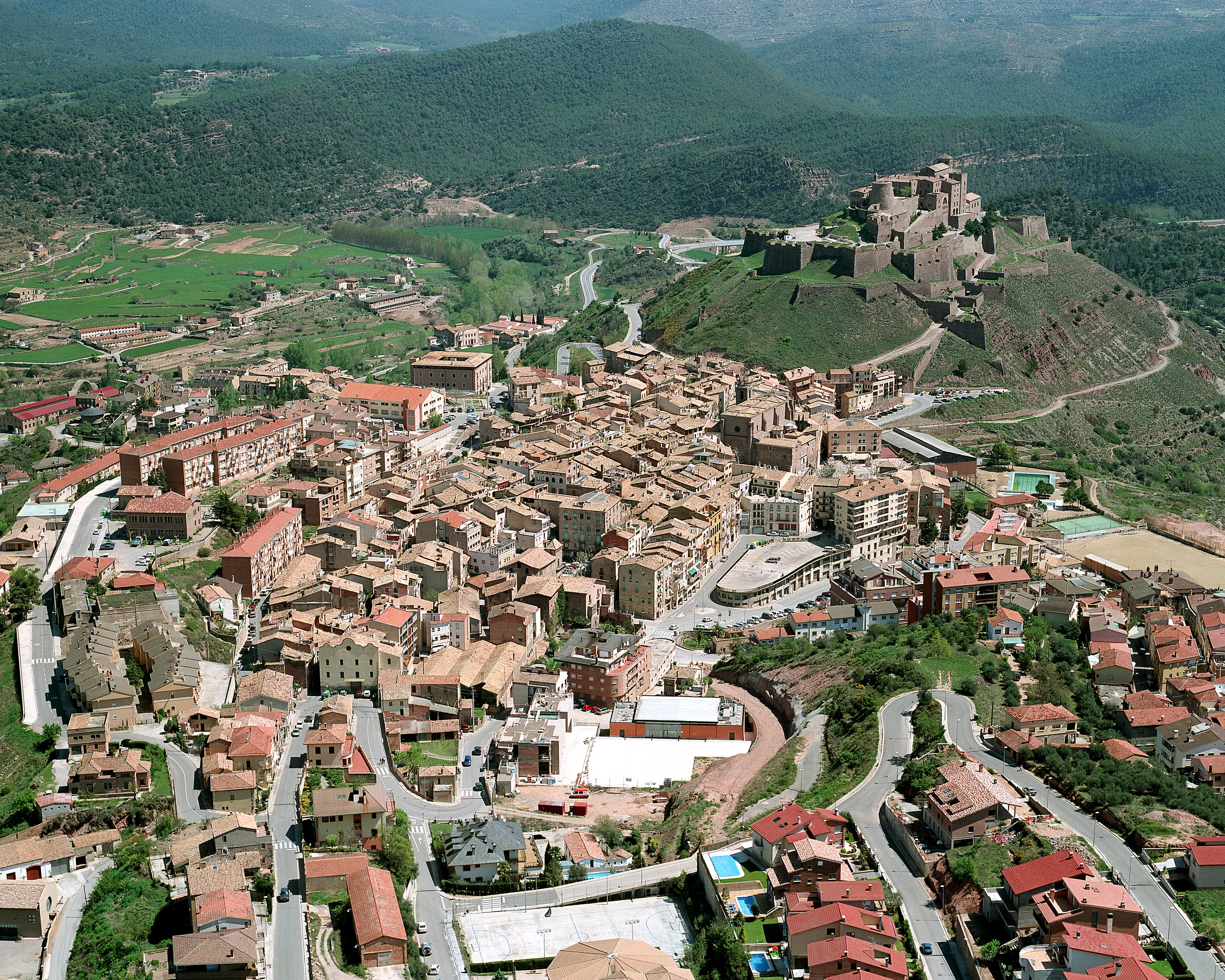
View of Cardona with the castle in the background (1991)

The combat of Cardona (21 October 1810) was a Spanish victory at Cardona, Barcelona, Catalonia during the Peninsular War.

The Spanish General Marquis de Campoverde's division, together with several thousand somatenes, had manned the town, its castle, and the neighbouring heights.

As Marshal Macdonald and his two Italian and two French brigades, approached, the Italian general Eugenio marched straight at the position, with Salme's French brigade in support, and was forced to retreat by the Spanish forces.
