= Battle of El Pla =

1811 battle during the Peninsular War

- Part of Peninsular War
| Date | 15 January 1811 |
| Location | El Pla de Santa Maria, Catalonia, Spain 41°22′N 1°17′E |
| Result | Spanish victory |

Belligerents
| (France) First French Empire; Napoleonic Italy | Kingdom of Spain |

Commanders and leaders
| (France) Jacques MacDonald (Kingdom of Italy (Napoleonic)) Francesco Eugenio † (Kingdom of Italy (Napoleonic)) Giuseppe Palombini | (Spain) Marquis Campoverde (Spain) Pedro Sarsfield |

Units involved
| (France) VII Corps | (Spain) Army of Catalonia |

Strength
| 6,000 | 3,800 |

Casualties and losses
| 600 | 160 |

Peninsular War: Aragón Catalonia
current battle

The Battle of El Pla was a battle on 15 January 1811 between an Imperial French column made up of two Italian brigades on one side and a Spanish division, under the command of Pedro Sarsfield on the other. The Spanish troops held steady and repulsed the attack of the first brigade, then counterattacked and defeated both brigades. The combat occurred during the Peninsular War, part of the Napoleonic Wars. The action was fought near El Pla de Santa Maria, north of Valls, Catalonia, Spain.

== Background ==
The Siege of Tortosa ended on 2 January 1811 when the Spanish garrison surrendered to Louis Gabriel Suchet's III Corps. During the siege, Marshal Jacques MacDonald's VII Corps blocked the Catalan army of Luis González Torres de Navarra, Marquess of Campoverde from interfering with Suchet's operations.

== Battle ==
With the siege finished, MacDonald moved toward Lleida (Lérida) with 12,000 troops. After reaching Valls, his vanguard commander Francesco Orsatelli (called Eugenio) heard that an enemy force was nearby and determined to attack it. Eugenio was mortally wounded and his brigade driven back by Sarsfeld's men. After Giuseppe Federico Palombini's brigade joined Eugenio's survivors, Sarsfield attacked again and defeated both Italian units. Only the intervention of a handful of French cavalry led by Jacques-Antoine-Adrien Delort prevented a complete disaster. After the day's action, MacDonald found that Campoverde's main force was coming up behind him. During the night, the French marshal force-marched his troops north to Montblanc on the road to Llieda, conceding the battlefield to the Spanish.

== Forces ==
The Imperial forces included two battalions each of the 1st and 2nd Italian Light Infantry Regiments, two battalions each of the 2nd, 4th, and 5th Italian Line Infantry Regiments, and one battalion of the 8th Italian Line Infantry Regiment. There were also 30 cavalrymen from the Italian Royal Chasseurs à Cheval. Two squadrons of the French 24th Dragoon Regiment became engaged at the end of the battle.

== Aftermath ==
The French conquest of Aragon proceeded with the Siege of Figueras. Vicente McGrath, a captain in the Ultonia Regiment is awarded a Gold Medal for Bravery in this engagement, a very rare distinction.
