= Marquis of Campoverde =

Spanish military officer

Luis González Torres de Navarra Castro, 5th Marquis of Campoverde, was a Spanish military commander during the Peninsular War.

Highly polemical, according to his biography at Spain's Real Academia de la Historia, all Spanish and British historians have criticised his command of the Army of Catalonia and, especially, his role in the fall of Tarragona in June 1811.

== Peninsular War ==
He saw action at the Battle of Mollet (January 1810). At the Combat of Cardona (October 1810), Campoverde's division, together with several thousand somatenes, had manned the town, its castle, and the neighbouring heights. Without waiting for Marshal Macdonald and the reserve brigade, the Italian general Eugenio marched straight at the Spanish position, with Salme's French brigade in support, and was forced to retreat.

When the captain general of Catalonia, O'Donnell, was forced to retire to Palma de Mallorca, due to the wound he received at La Bisbal, his command should have gone to the senior lieutenant-general in Catalonia, General Iranzo. However, Campoverde and his supporters staged a mutiny at Reus, and he was proclaimed interim captain general of Catalonia, (Note: Oman (1911: p. 241.) however, states that it was due to Iranzo himself not wishing to take the command.) and commander-in-chief of the Army of Catalonia. Later that month his troops were defeated at the Battle of El Pla (January 1811).

On 3 May 1811, Campoverde tried, unsuccessfully, to lift the Siege of Figueras. This action, when reported in the Diario de Manresa, insinuated that the Spanish cuirassiers had failed in their duty. This bad press led to a group of cuirassiers belonging to the 1st Army of Spain destroying the printing press of the paper and burning all the copies in the main square of the city. They then destroyed the house of the priest who was commissioned by the Junta to publish the newspaper, which had a circulation of 1,200, and put out search parties to capture him. The priest was forced to flee to the mountains where, towards the end of that month he was able to reach the monastery of Montserrat, the headquarters of the Junta, and appeal for protection from the governor and the captain-general. (Note: However, 14 months later, an officer and five other members of the same corps of cuirassiers appeared at the priest's house demanding he hand over the original documents on which he had based his accusations and, when he was unable to do so, they forced him to walk from Manresa, surrounded by six mounted cuirassiers, at 3 pm, with all the heat of the August sun, to the gaol at Prats de Lluçanès. The public scandal at seeing the priest mistreated in such a manner led to Luis de Lacy, who had by then replaced Campoverde as capitan-general of Catalonia, setting the priest free, albeit a week later, and ordering an inquiry. Since nothing came of said inquiry, the matter was finally brought before the Regency in April 1813. (Diario de las sesiones de Cortes 1810/13.))

=== Siege of Tarragona ===
Having been given the command of Tarragona at the end of May 1811, (Note: The previous governor had been Campoverde's brother who, just the previous year, had capitulated to Suchet at Lérida. (Gil Novales, 2010: p. 1353.) the third week of siege by Suchet, Juan de Contreras made repeated requests for Campoverde's help. According to Oman (1911),

[...] between the 16th and the 24th June, the critical days in the siege, Campoverde and his 11,000 men had no effect whatever on the course of operations. Yet he kept sending messages to Contreras promising him prompt assistance, and on the 20th bade him dispatch Sarsfield out of the city, to assume command of his old division in the fighting which was just about to begin. That fighting never took place—to the Captain-General's eternal disgrace—for at the last moment he flinched from placing himself within engaging distance of Suchet. [...] But to skulk in the hills many miles away and send detachments against outlying French posts could have no effect.

=== Remainder of the war ===
At the beginning of July 1812, Campoverde handed over his command General Luis Lacy.

== Post-war career ==
He was promoted to lieutenant general in 1815. In 1819, Captain general Francisco Eguía had him arrested and he was imprisoned by the Inquisition, accused of having participated with Van Halen in the Masonic plot of Granada in 1817. He was released from prison with the coming of the Trienio Liberal in 1820 and appointed captain general of Granada.

== Bibliography ==
- Història de la Guerra del Francès a Catalunya. (in Catalan)
- Glover, Michael (2001). The Peninsular War 1807-1814. London: Penguin. ISBN 0-141-39041-7
- Smith, Digby (1998). The Napoleonic Wars Data Book. London: Greenhill. ISBN 1-85367-276-9
