= Juan de Contreras =

Spanish general

Juan Senén de Contreras Torres (1760–1830) was a Spanish military commander.

== Early career ==
Born in the province of Toledo, Contreras joined the Regiment of Alcázar de San Juan as a cadet in 1772, being promoted to lieutenant in 1783. He took an especial interest in studying mathematics, as applied to warfare, and in 1787, after having published a compendium of the writings of the Marquis de Santa Cruz de Marcenado, the King sent him on a four-year tour of Europe to continue his studies. Returning to Madrid in September 1791, he was promoted to captain the following year and that April, to lieutenant colonel of the Regiment of Alcázar.

After seeing action in the War of the Pyrenees, at Irún (30 August), Vera (7 September), Urrugne (5 February 1794), Yzpegui (3 June), Baztán (23 & 24 June) and Lecumberri (15 October), in 1798 Contreras was promoted to lieutenant colonel of the Division of Provincial Grenadiers of New Castile, garrisoned at Cartagena.

In August 1800, his division garrisoned Badajoz and Alcántara and saw action in the War of the Oranges, participating at Juromenha and the sieges of Elvas and Campo Maior.

== Peninsular War ==
Promoted to brigadier in August 1808, he was sent to join the vanguard of the Army of the centre, and the following December he was given command of the Regiment of Sigüenza.

In February 1809, he was given command of the 4th Infantry Division of Cartaojal's Ejército de la Mancha but was transferred to the Army of Extremadura the following April. There, as part of Bassecourt's 5th División, he was given command of a brigade formed by the Regiments of Sigüenza and Murcia, with which he saw action at Talavera (July 1809). The following August, he led the 5th Division at the Battle of Arzobispo.

In March–April 1810, the Marquis of La Romana sent Contreras's division, together with those of Mendizabal and Ballesteros, to harass the French 2nd Corps (still under the temporary command of General Heudelet) in Andalusia.

Following his defence of Cartagena, he was promoted to field marshal in April 1810 and appointed military governor of La Coruña and commander-in-chief of Galicia.

=== Siege of Tarragona ===
In April 1811, he was transferred to the 1st Army of Catalonia, where the following May, Marquis de Campoverde gave him the command of Tarragona, then in its third week of siege by Suchet. Contreras took over command from Campoverde's brother, Field Marshal González who, almost exactly a year earlier, 14 May 1810, as governor of the castle of Lérida, had capitulated at the Siege of Lérida, precisely to Suchet.

On 28 June 1811, while leading a counterattack at the head of the Regiment of Saboya, Contreras was gravely wounded in the belly by a bayonet and taken prisoner.

Held prisoner at Bouillon, he managed to escape in October 1812 and was finally able to reach Portsmouth on 1 June 1813 and returning to Spain the following October.

== Post-war career ==
In 1813, he published Sitio de Tarragona, lo que pasó entre los franceses y el general Contreras que la defendió (The Siege of Tarragona, What Happened between the French and General Contreras Who Defended It), which was published in London and immediately translated into French and English.

Fernando VII appointed him lieutenant general in October 1814. During the Hundred Days he was attached to the Observation Corps of the Right.

Due to his absolutist leanings, he was banished from Madrid during the Trienio Liberal and confined to barracks first at Seville and later at Granada.

Following the return of Fernando VII, he was appointed captain general of Galicia.
