= Sagunto Castle =

Fortress near Valencia in Spain

- Near Sagunto in Spain
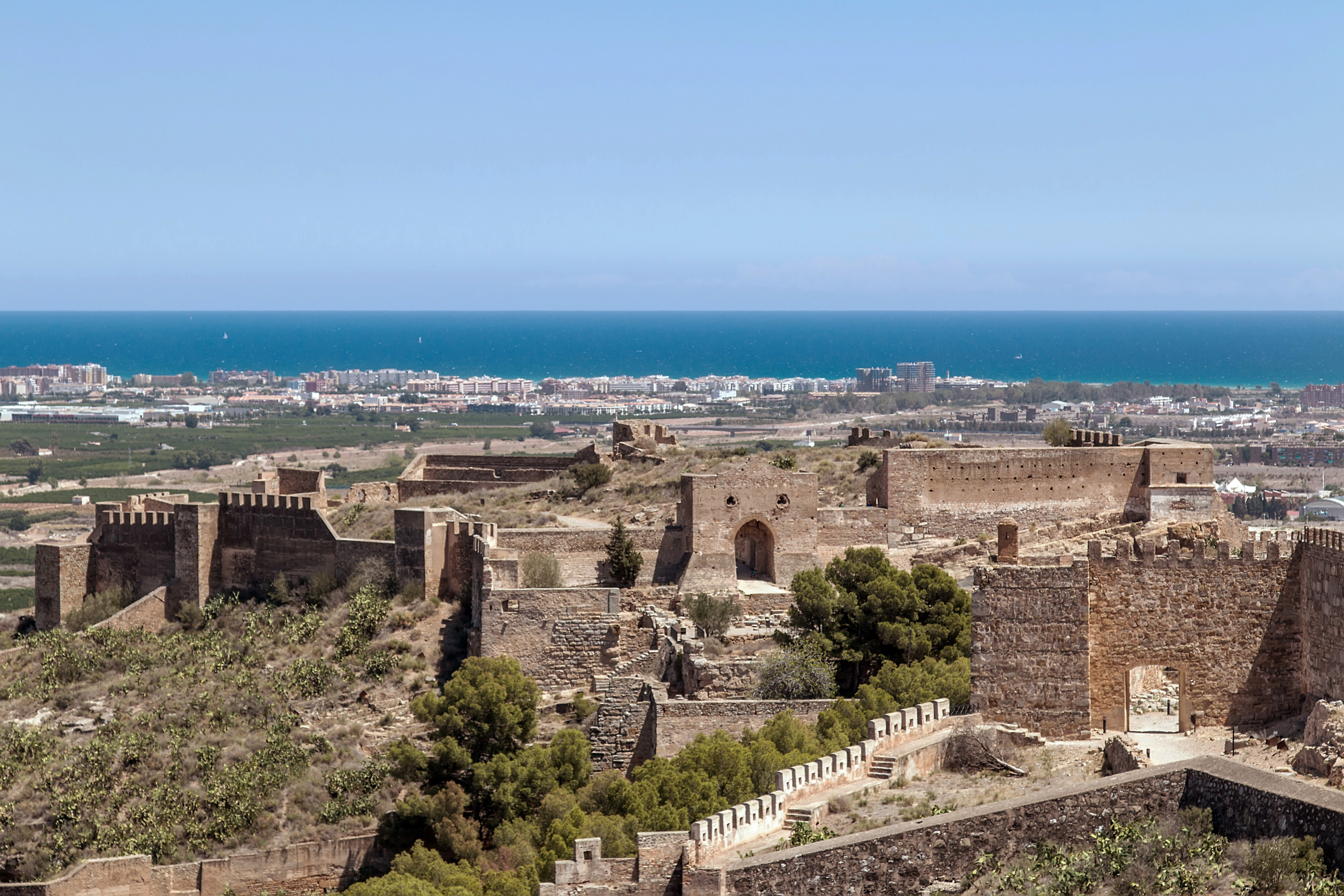
- View across the walls of Sagunto Castle

Site information
- Type: Castle

Location
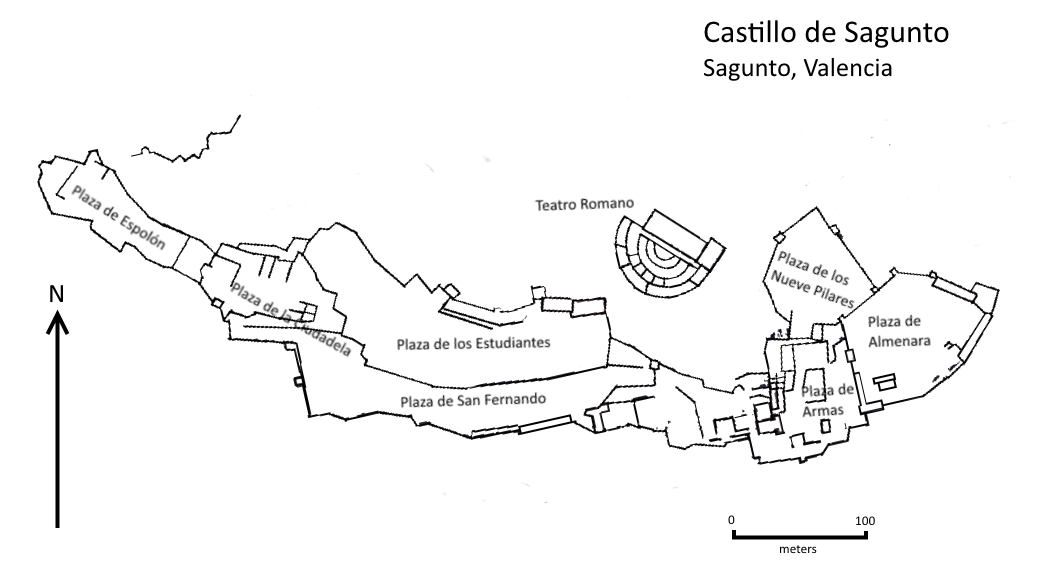
- Map of the castle
- Location within Spain
- Coordinates: 39°40′33″N 0°16′39″W

Sagunto Castle (Spanish: Castillo de Sagunto; Valencian: Castell de Sagunt) is a fortress overlooking the town of Sagunto, near Valencia in Spain. The site's history extends back over two thousand years and includes Iberian, Roman and medieval remains. During the Islamic period, the castle was known as Murbĩtar and Morvedre. The castle was declared a National Monument in 1931.

The sacking of the Iberian settlement by Hannibal in 219 BC led to the outbreak of the Second Punic War. The visible walls are largely Islamic in origin, with substantial modifications taking place after the end of Islamic rule, with the defences being strengthened and modernised. In 1811, during the Napoleonic Wars, the French laid siege to the castle, and were ultimately successful in taking it, after which the defences were repaired.

== Location ==
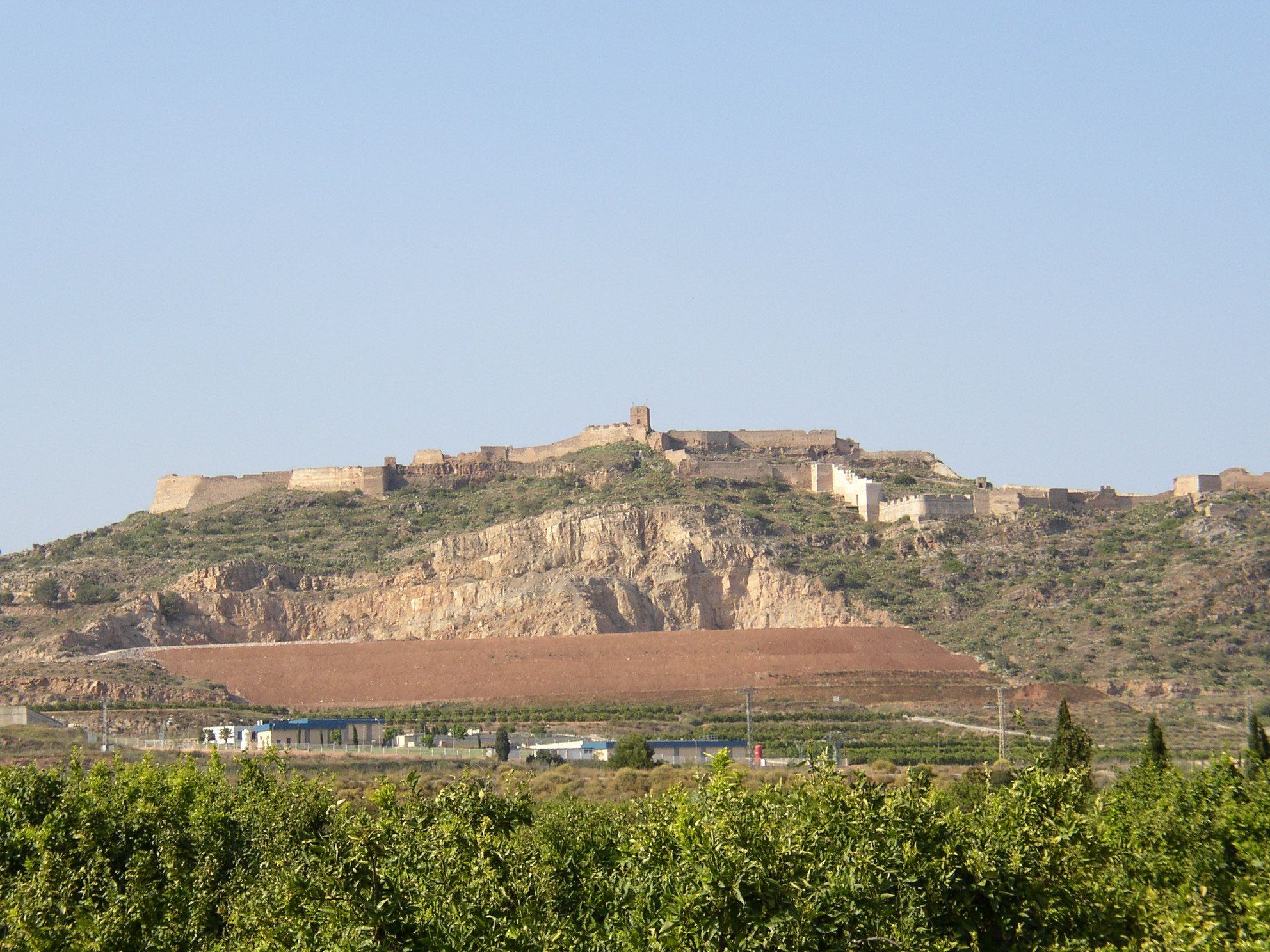
Sagunto Castle occupies a prominent hilltop

The castle is located 23 kilometres (14 mi) north of Valencia, upon a flat-topped hill. The hill is the last upthrust of the Sierra Calderona mountains, reaching an altitude of 172 metres (564 ft) above mean sea level.

== Etymology ==
The original Iberian name for the city was Arse. Sagunto was originally recorded as a Roman municipium in the middle of the 1st century BC, as the Municipium Saguntinum, or simply Saguntum. During the reign of Wamba, king of the Visigoths, the old Roman municipium became referred to as Sagunto, and it continued under this name until 711 AD, and the end of the Visigoth kingdom. During the Muslim domination of Spain, the Mozarabs referred to the town as Murum Veterum, the "old wall", a name already in use by the 11th century. In time this form was contracted and corrupted into forms such as Murvetrum, Morvedre, and Molvedre, and the Muslims modified this into Murbiter. Christian documents from the 11th century use the form Murus Vetulus.

== Description ==
The site occupies a hilltop overlooking the Mediterranean Sea, and is surrounded by defensive walls. The castle is divided into seven main sections or plazas. The principal divisions are the Plaza de Armas, Plaza de Almenara, Plaza de los Nueve Pilares, Plaza de San Fernando, Plaza de los Estudiantes, Plaza de la Ciudadela and Plaza del Espolón. The visible ruins are essentially those of the Muslim citadel, with later modifications under Christian rule, and finally by French engineers during the Peninsular War.

=== Curtain wall ===
The curtain wall mostly dates to the Islamic period; it descended from the castle to connect to a series of fortifications laid out around the town below. It underwent substantial modifications from the Christian period through to the Peninsular War, with Gothic and Renaissance reworking of Muslim fortifications. A number of towers and bastions survive, mostly dating to the 18th century.

=== Plaza del Refectorio ===
The Plaza del Refectorio is the smallest of the plazas, situated in the centre of the castle upon an elevation that also supports the Reina Gobernadora battery. The Plaza del Refectorio takes its name from a number of vaulted arcades that were used as refectories. Its east side is formed by the refectory building; it is bordered on the south side by the curtain wall, on the west by a ruined double wall and a Roman tower, and on the north by a fortified wall. A corridor running between the Plaza del Refectorio and the battery links the Plaza de Armas with the Plaza de San Fernando.

=== Roman remains ===
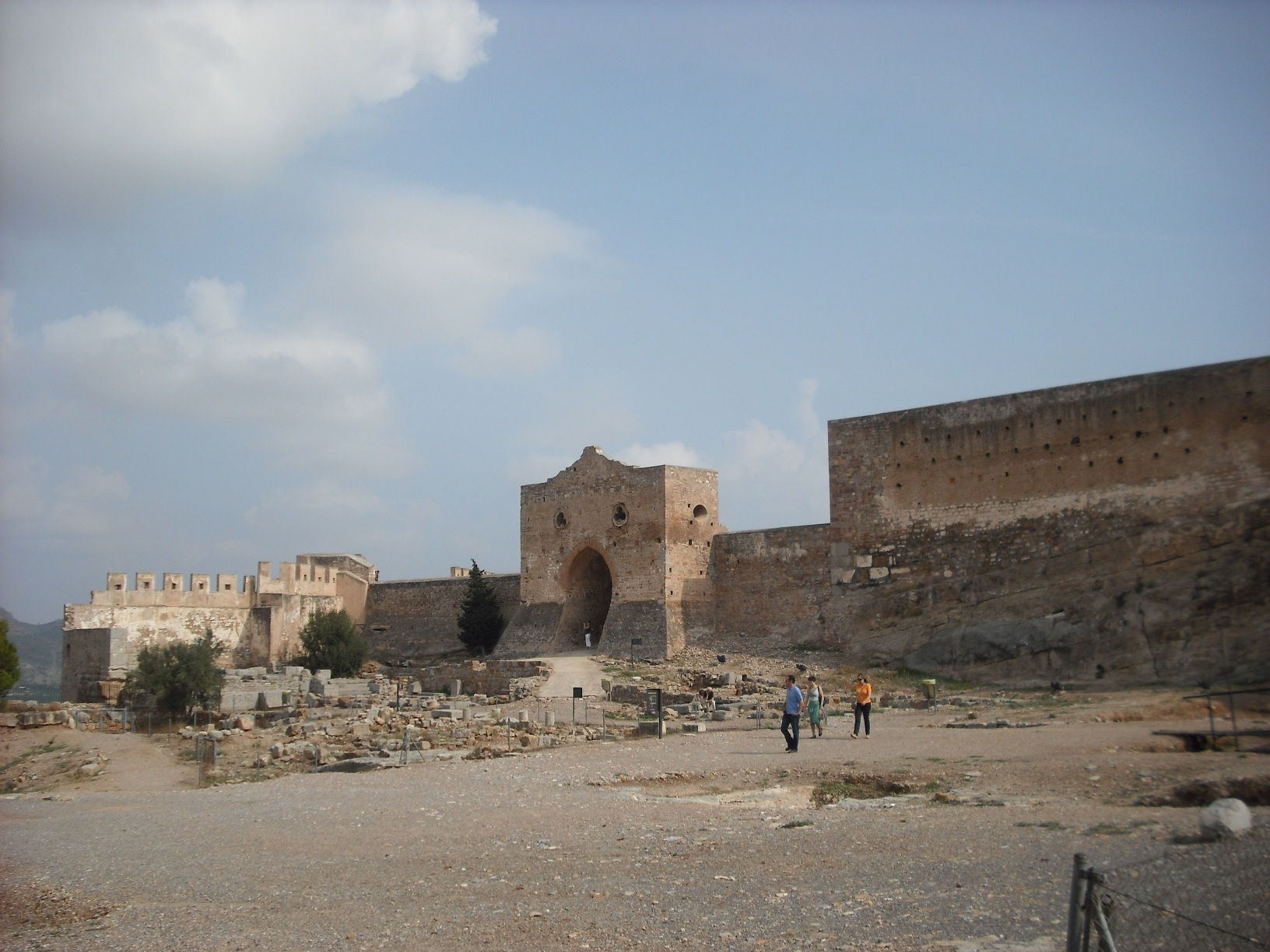
The Almenara Gate overlooks the foundations of the Roman forum

The Plaza de Armas is accessed via an Islamic arch. Remains of the Iberian defensive wall are visible on the east side of the castle. The foundations of the Roman forum, together with those of some Iberian buildings, and those of a Roman temple or capitolium, are all located in the forum area of the castle, upon the hilltop. The ruins of the Roman buildings are laid out around a square measuring 60 by 36.5 metres (197 by 120 ft). The plaza was fronted on the west side by a basilica that measured 60 by 20 metres (197 by 66 ft). The east side of the square was lined by a row of tabernae (shops). To the south of the plaza is a well-preserved cistern, and the base of the temple or capitolium are on the north side. The temple measured 14 by 12 metres (46 by 39 ft). A complex building was situated on the northeast side of the plaza; it has not been securely identified but it may have been a curia (assembly or court building) or a temple of Augustus. Since it possessed two large parallel chambers, it may have served both functions. The remains of a Roman theatre stand some 50 metres (160 ft) down the hillside to the northwest of the forum. The cistern is likely to have been built when the city was rebuilt after the Second Punic War.

The Roman forum was excavated in 1985. The original forum dated to the Late Republican period, and was largely demolished in the Early Imperial period in order to build a new forum. The replacement was built during the reign of Augustus, and paid for by Gnaeus Baebius Geminus, a local aristocrat. The hilltop was levelled, and retaining walls reinforced by buttresses supported the artificial platform that served as a foundation for the forum. On the north side of the forum, the retaining walls and buttressing are still visible.

== History ==
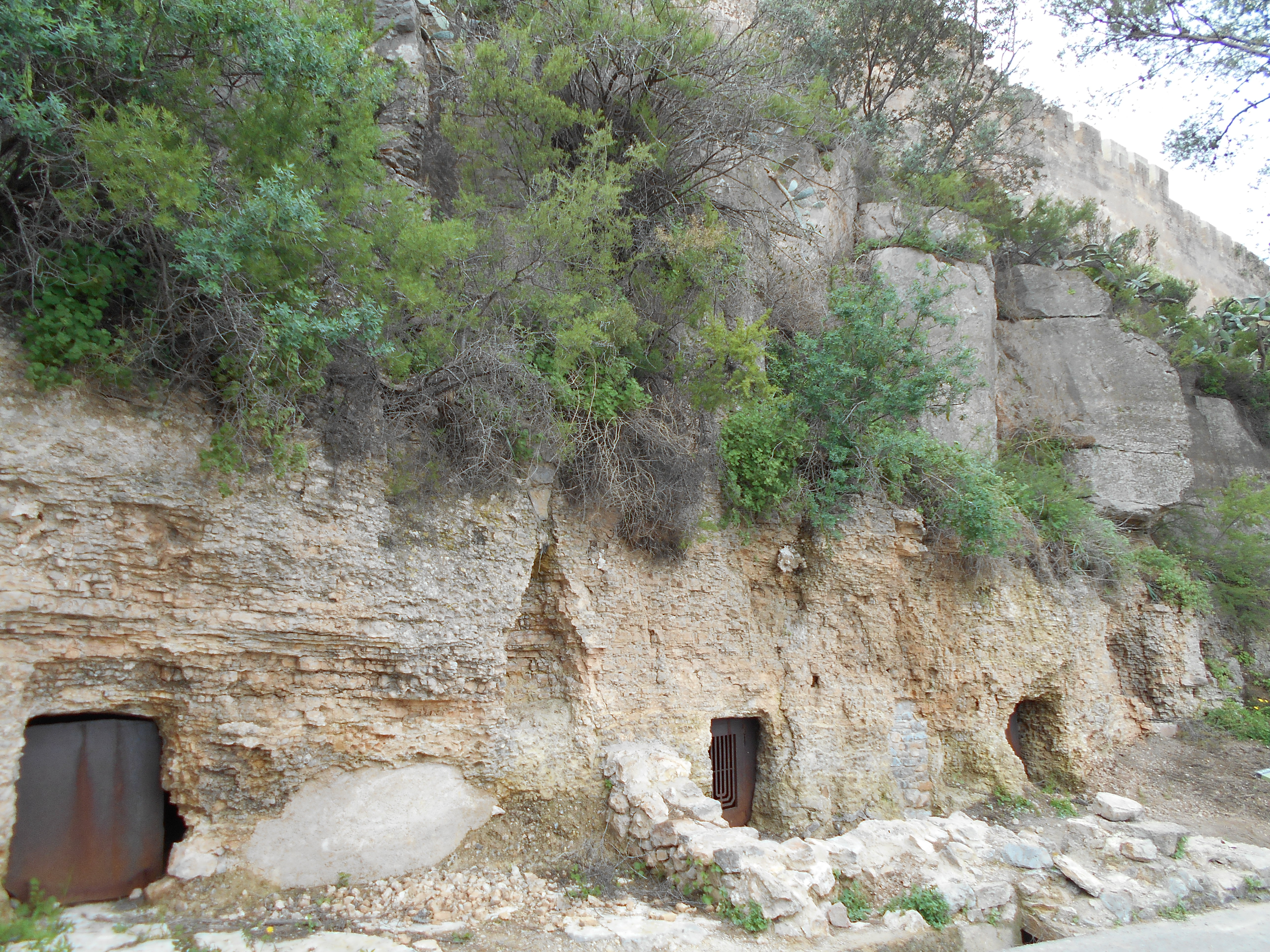
Jewish tombs under the walls of Sagunto Castle

The site was apparently first settled by the Iberians in the early Iron Age. These early inhabitants belonged to the Edetani tribe. As the Carthaginian Empire expanded, the inhabitants formed a defensive alliance with Rome. The Carthaginian general Hannibal sacked the Iberian settlement in 219 BC, an action that led to the outbreak of the Second Punic War. In 214 BC, the Romans took Sargunto from the Carthaginians. Between 175 and 100 BC, the Romans built a temple or capitolium on the hill. A water cistern was built close to the temple, and was later incorporated into the Imperial forum, in the 1st century AD. The history of the castle during the Islamic period is poorly studied, with Sagunto being overshadowed by Valencia during that time. It was during the Islamic period that the Albacar portion of the castle was built, as well as most of the outer wall. 8th century Arab records from the reign of Abd al-Rahman I (ruled 755–788 AD) indicate that Sagunto fell within the jurisdiction of Tortosa at that time, rather than that of Valencia. Muslim historian Ibn Hayyan recorded that the castle was taken by force in 929–930, and mentions it again, under its Arab name, as submitting to the sultan Abd-ar-Rahman III in 933 AD. Sagunto Castle was used as a fortress by the Muslims to defend the regions of Catalonia and Valencia. It was seized and occupied by El Cid from 1098 to 1102, and was definitively removed from Muslim rule by Christian king Jaume I in 1238, who incorporated it into the Kingdom of Valencia. By the mid-13th century, the castle was garrisoned by Christians, although the majority of the town's inhabitants were still Muslims.

By the early 14th century, Sagunto (still known as Morvedre) had a growing Jewish population, resulting in the establishment of a Jewish cemetery under the castle walls in 1328. Peter IV of Aragon reinforced the castle defences in the 14th century. In 1363, King Peter of Castile took the castle after laying siege to it. In 1562, Juan Bautista Antonelli was commissioned by King Philip II of Spain to improve and modernise the castle's defences; it was at this time that the castle precinct was divided into seven plazas. During the Spanish War of Succession, in the early 18th century, the castle was surrendered to the Archduke of Austria, but soon afterwards it passed under the control of King Philip V of Spain. In 1811, during the Peninsular War, Brigadier Andriani defended the castle against French troops commanded by General Suchet, who laid siege to the fortress on 23 September of that year. Andriani withstood the siege and several assaults, although Suchet was ultimately victorious. After taking the castle, Suchet ordered it to be repaired and strengthened the defences. These modifications were overseen by Andriani.

In 1932, M. González Simancas excavated the general area of the Roman remains in the Plaza de Armas, but left few records of his investigations.

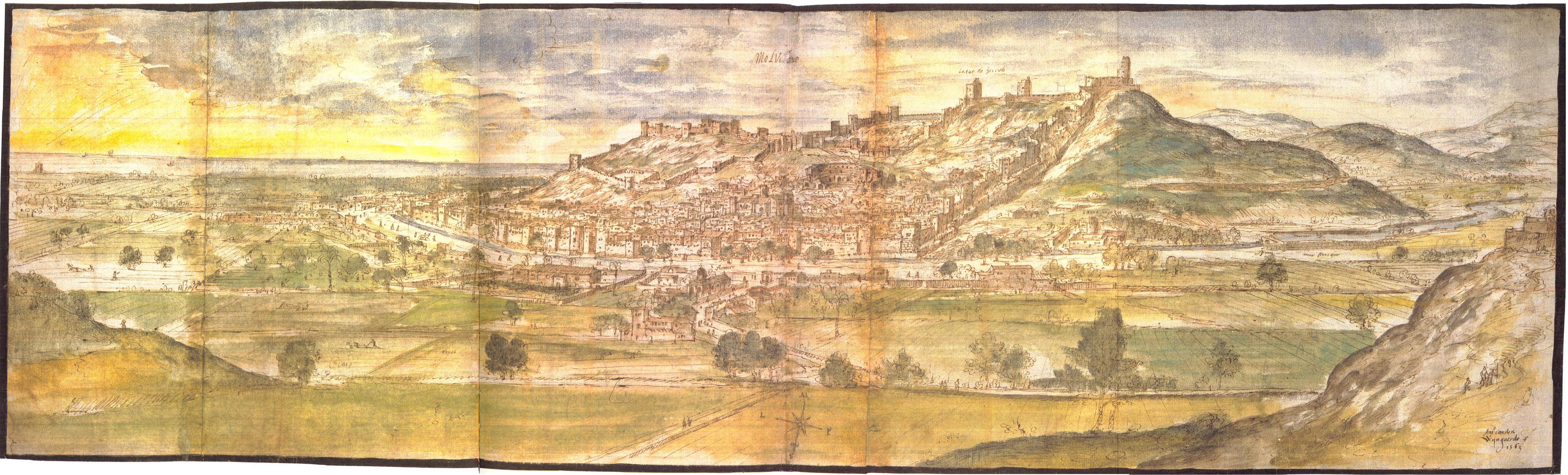
Illustration of Sagunto Castle produced in 1563 by Anton van den Wyngaerde

== General and cited references ==
- Agència Valenciana del Turisme (2016). Castillo de Sagunto (in Spanish). Valencia, Spain: Generalitat Valenciana. Archived from the original on 2016-09-06. Retrieved 2017-03-28.
- Aranegui Gascó, Carmen (1984). La cisterna del flanco septentrional del foro de Saguntum (Archived 2017-03-30 at the Wayback Machine) (in Spanish). SAGVNTVM, 18, pp. 195–203. Valencia, Spain: Departament de Prehistòria i Arqueologia de la Universitat de València. ISSN 2174-517X. doi:10.7203/SAGVNTVM.
- Baixauli i Bach, Vicent (2013). Alberg per a estudiosos i viatgers al Castell de Sagunt (Archived 2024-05-11 at the Wayback Machine) (in Catalan). Valencia, Spain: Escola Tècnica Superior d’Arquitectura de València, Universitat Politècnica de València.
- Carruana Martínez, José Ángel; Manuel Civera i Gómez (2000). El gliptograma de la porta nord de la Plaça del Refectori del Castell de Sagunt Archived 2013-07-12 at the Wayback Machine. Revista ARSE, 34, pp. 17–30. Sagunto, Spain: Centro Arqueológico Saguntino. (in Catalan)
- Centro Arqueológico Saguntino (1972). Aspectos gráficos del Castillo de Sagunto Archived 2024-05-11 at the Wayback Machine. Revista ARSE, 12, pp. 35–36/67-68. Sagunto, Spain: Centro Arqueológico Saguntino. (in Spanish)
- Chabret, Antonio (2008) [1901]. Sagunto. Nomenclator de las calles, plazas y puertas antiguas y modernas de la ciudad Archived 2024-05-11 at the Wayback Machine. Valladolid, Spain: Editorial MAXTOR. ISBN 9788497614429. (in Spanish)
- Collins, Roger (1998). Spain: An Oxford Archaeological Guide. Oxford, England: Oxford University Press. ISBN 0-19-285300-7.
- Franco Sánchez, Francisco (2006). Sagunto/Murbĩtar en el período islámico: Su historia a través de los textos Archived 2024-05-11 at the Wayback Machine. De Murbiter a Morvedre. Valencia and Alicante, Spain: Fundación Bancaja and Universidad de Alicante. ISBN 9788484711063. OCLC 232002503 (in Spanish)
- Gates, David (2001) [1986]. The Spanish Ulcer: A History of the Peninsular War. Cambridge, Massachusetts, US: Da Capo Press. ISBN 0-306-81083-2.
- Mateu y Llopis, Felipe (1983), Del Municipium Saguntinum al Morvedre mozárabe (in Spanish) (Archived 2013-07-12 at the Wayback Machine). Revista ARSE, 18, pp. 23–28/361-366. Sagunto, Spain: Centro Arqueológico Saguntino.
- Meyerson, Mark D. (2004). Jews in an Iberian Frontier Kingdom: Society, Economy, and Politics in Morvedre, 1248–1391 (Archived 2024-05-11 at the Wayback Machine). Leiden, Netherlands: Brill. ISBN 90-04-13739-4. OCLC 803887472.
- Tourist Info Sagunto. Sagunto Histórico: 26 Castillo (in Spanish) (Archived 31 March 2017 at the Wayback Machine). Sagunto, Spain: Oficina de Turismo. Retrieved 2017-03-30
