= Pedro Sarsfield =

Spanish army officer of Irish descent (1781–1837)

- Born: 28 December 1781; Ceuta
- Died: 26 August 1837 (aged 55); Pamplona, Spain
- Military career
- Allegiance: Kingdom of Spain
- Branch: Infantry
- Rank: Lieutenant General
- Conflicts: Spanish-Moroccan War of 1790–1791; Siege of Ceuta (1790–1791); War of the Pyrenees; Peninsular War; Siege of Tortosa; Battle of El Pla; Siege of Figueras; Siege of Tarragona; First Carlist War; Battle of Oriamendi

Pedro Sarsfield y Waters, 1st Count Sarsfield (1781–1837), was a Spanish general of Irish descent. He is considered one of the best Spanish tacticians among his generation.

Sarsfield was a descendant of Patrick Sarsfield, a celebrated Jacobite general, and one of many Spanish generals who were second- or third generation descendants of those came from Ireland after the Battle of the Boyne (1690).

== Early career ==
Having enlisted as a cadet in the Ultonia Infantry Regiment in 1791, he formed part of the garrison at Ceuta during the Siege of Ceuta (1790–1791), remaining there until the following year.

At the start of the War of the Pyrenees he was incorporated into the Army of Guipúzcoa and Navarra, and saw action at Irún and at the Battle of Sans Culottes Camp, where he participated in the capture the battery at the redoubt of Croix des Bouquets. In 1795, he saw action in Navarra and was promoted to Fusilier sub-lieutenant.

After the war, his regiment was sent to Galicia and on 31 December 1798, his battalion embarked for the Canary Islands to reinforce the garrison at Santa Cruz de Tenerife. In 1800, he was promoted to Grenadier sub-lieutenant. In 1802 he was sent to Barcelona and from there, marched to Galicia where he was stationed until 1802. That year, he was posted to the garrison at Gerona, and appointed instructor of the cadets there.

== Peninsular War ==
He was promoted to captain at the start of the war. The garrison was made up of the 350-strong Ultonia Regiment, under its two lieutenant-colonels, O'Donovan and O'Daly, together with a few trained artillerymen, and some 2,000 militiamen. That August, during the Second siege of Girona, his column of 200 men was attacked by French troops near the Capuchins Fort, one of the four forts surrounding the city, and only sixty men of the column were able to reach the safety of the fortress.

He was particularly noted for his involvement in the operations surrounding the Siege of Tortosa in 1810–1811. In a well-conducted action, he defeated two Italian brigades at the Battle of Pla on 15 January 1811. After failing to break the Siege of Figueras, his troops participated in the Siege of Tarragona in May and June 1811. He escaped the disaster, but his division was largely destroyed. Remnants of his division later joined Marquis de Campoverde's operation against the French forces led by Louis-Gabriel Suchet, who were occupying the Tarragona fortress.

== Post-war career ==
In 1819, he was second-in-command to Enrique O'Donnell, Conde de La Bisbal of the Ejército de Ultramar, the expeditionary force that was being prepared to put down the Spanish American wars of independence and was instrumental to foiling a liberal plot in 1819.

That year he was rewarded with promotion to Lieutenant General. But when the liberals took power the next year in the Trienio Liberal, he was banished to the Balearic Islands. He opposed the French intervention to restore Ferdinand, known as the Hundred Thousand Sons of Saint Louis. The 1830s found him leading the liberal army of Navarre during the First Carlist War. He was killed by mutineers at Pamplona in 1837, the same year he led his troops at the Battle of Oriamendi.

== Bibliography ==
- Guia de Forasteros en Madrid. La Imprenta Nacional. 1821.
- Oman, Charles (1996). A History of the Peninsular War Volume III. Mechanicsburg, Pennsylvania: Stackpole. ISBN 1-85367-223-8.
- Oman, Charles (1996). A History of the Peninsular War Volume IV. Mechanicsburg, Pennsylvania: Stackpole. ISBN 1-85367-224-6.
- Smith, Digby (1998). The Napoleonic Wars Data Book. London: Greenhill. ISBN 1-85367-276-9.
