= Siege of Tarragona (1811) =

1811 siege during the Peninsular War

- Part of Peninsular War
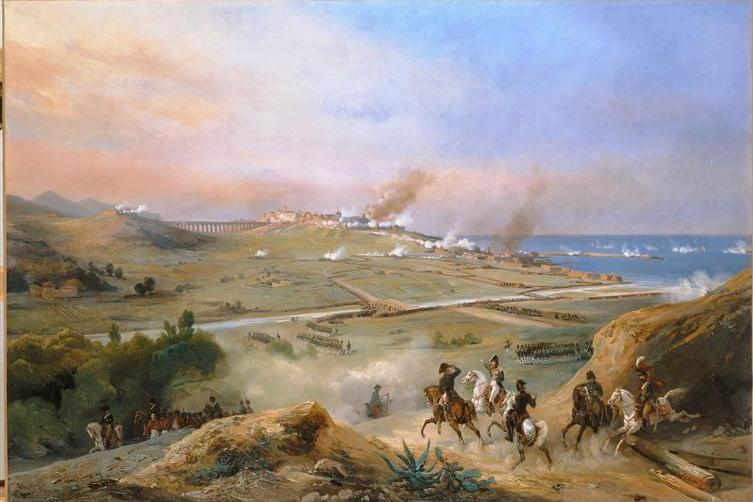
- Capture of Tarragona, 28 June 1811 by Jean-Charles-Joseph Rémond, 1836
Date	5 May – 29 June 1811
Location	Tarragona, Catalonia, Spain 41.1156°N 1.2494°E
Result	French victory

Belligerents
(France) French Empire	Spain; United Kingdom

Commanders and leaders
(France) Marshal Suchet	(Spain) Juan de Contreras (United Kingdom) Edward Codrington

Strength
18,000	18,000

Casualties and losses
4,300	18,000

Peninsular War: Aragón Catalonia
current battle

In the siege of Tarragona, from 5 May to 29 June 1811, Louis Gabriel Suchet's French Army of Aragon laid siege to a Spanish garrison led by Lieutenant General Juan Senen de Contreras. A British naval squadron commanded by Admiral Edward Codrington harassed the French besiegers with cannon fire and transported large numbers of reinforcements into the city by sea. Nevertheless, Suchet's troops stormed into the defenses and killed or captured almost all the defenders. The action took place at the port of Tarragona, Catalonia, on the east coast of Spain during the Peninsular War, part of the Napoleonic Wars.

== Background ==
The French conquest of Aragon had started with the Siege of Tortosa.

== Siege ==
Emperor Napoleon offered Suchet a marshal's baton if he could capture Tarragona, so the French general pursued his goal vigorously. He methodically overran the city's outer works as he drove his siege parallels forward. The French general easily fended off weak attempts to relieve the city by land. Near the end of the siege, the French troops captured the lower city in a surprise attack and the garrison's survivors retreated to the upper city. At the end, Suchet's men stormed into the upper city amid scenes of horrific slaughter, including the murder of civilians. The loss of this major base and so many Spanish troops crippled the Army of Catalonia. Napoleon duly awarded Suchet the coveted rank of marshal.

== Results ==
One authority gave French losses as 4,300 killed and wounded out of an army of 21,635 men, including General of Division Jean-Baptiste Salme killed. Total Spanish losses numbered between 14,000 and 15,000. Of these, 8,000 were captured and the rest were killed, wounded, or died of disease. During the butchery attending the final assault, the French attackers massacred numerous civilians including 450 women and children. A second authority asserted that total Spanish losses were 15,000, of whom 7,000 were killed outright. French losses were given as 1,000 killed and 3,000 wounded or sick.

== Aftermath ==
The French conquest of Aragon proceeded with the Siege of Valencia.

== See also ==
- (in German) Juan Senen Contreras
- (in French) Jean-Baptiste Salme

== Notes ==
Preceded by Battle of Fuentes de Oñoro	Napoleonic Wars; Siege of Tarragona (1811)	Succeeded by Battle of Albuera
