= François Jean Baptiste Quesnel =

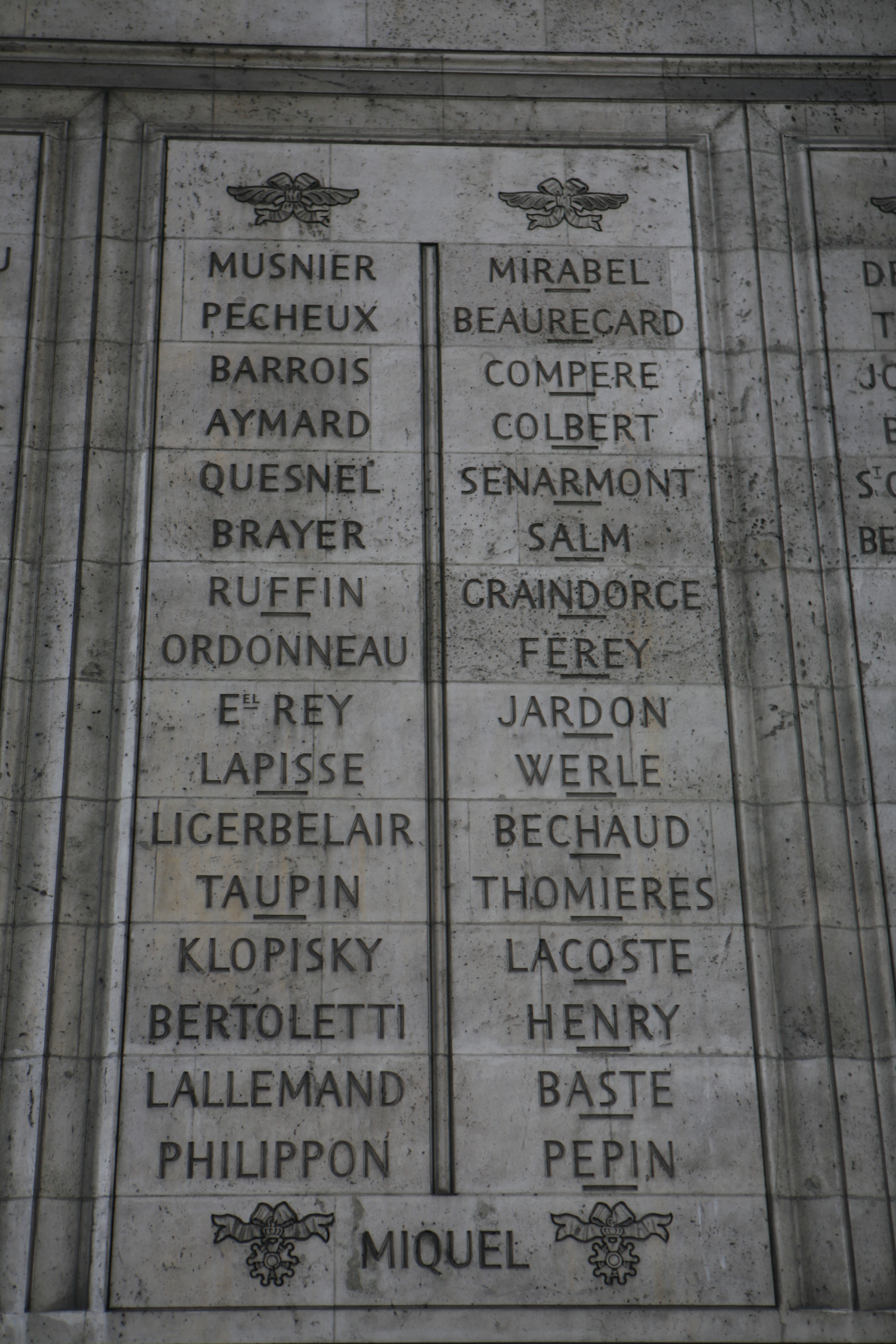
- Quesnel is the fifth name on Column 37 of the Arc de Triomphe.
- Born: 18 January 1765; Saint-Germain-en-Laye, France
- Died: 8 April 1819 (aged 54) Paris, France
- Allegiance: France
- Branch: Infantry, Cavalry
- Service years: 1782–1815
- Rank: General of Division
- Conflicts: French Revolutionary Wars; War of the Pyrenees; War in the Vendée; Italian campaigns; Battle of Verona; Battle of Magnano; Battle of Cassano; Battle of Bassignana; Battle of Novi; Napoleonic Wars; Peninsular War; Invasion of Portugal; Second Battle of Porto; Siege of Figueras; Battle of Feistritz; Battle of Bassano; Battle of Caldiero; Battle of the Mincio River
- Awards: Légion d'Honneur, CC, 1804; Order of Saint Louis, 1814
- Other work: Baron of the Empire, 1810

François Jean Baptiste Quesnel du Torpt (French pronunciation: [fʁɑ̃swa ʒɑ̃ batist kenɛl]; 18 January 1765 – 8 April 1819) became a division commander under the First French Empire of Napoleon. By the time the French Revolutionary Wars began, he had been a non-commissioned officer in the French army for nearly a decade. Within less than two years he rose to the rank of general officer while fighting against Spain. His career then stagnated until the War of the Second Coalition when he led a brigade in Italy at Verona, Magnano, Cassano, Bassignana where he was wounded, and Novi.

Promoted to division command in 1805, he filled non-combat posts in the interior. He was captured in 1808 after participating in the 1807 Invasion of Portugal. After being released, he served in the 1809 Invasion of Portugal but was later detached to lead a column of dismounted cavalrymen back to France. He led a division at Figueras in 1811. During the War of the Sixth Coalition he commanded a division under Eugène de Beauharnais in Italy, fighting at the battles of Feistritz, Bassano, Caldiero, and the Mincio. He retired from the army in 1815 and drowned in the Seine under mysterious circumstances in 1819. Quesnel is one of the names inscribed under the Arc de Triomphe on Column 37.

== Revolution ==
Quesnel was born on 18 January 1765 in Saint-Germain-en-Laye which is now part of Yvelines department near Paris. He enlisted in the 25th Infantry Regiment in the French Royal Army on 18 July 1782. He was promoted to corporal on 18 September 1783, sergeant on 10 October 1784, and farrier on 7 July 1786. After the outbreak of the French Revolution he advanced in rank to sergeant major on 12 September 1789 and sous lieutenant on 15 September 1791. After this, his promotions followed with dizzying swiftness. He became a lieutenant of grenadiers on 19 April 1792 and captain on 1 May of the same year. Promotion to adjutant general chef de bataillon came on 15 May 1793 and adjutant general chef de brigade on 30 September 1793. He became a general of brigade on 26 December 1793.

During this period Quesnel served in the Army of the North and Army of the Eastern Pyrenees. At the Battle of Boulou on 30 April 1794, French army commander Jacques François Dugommier launched a heavy attack on the Spanish right center, bending back the enemy lines. The following day, the French cracked the Spanish defenses and the cavalry commander, André de la Barre ordered Quesnel to take his brigade and harass the retreat of one enemy column. His troopers herded the Spanish into a deadly ambush in the Le Perthus Pass and their foes were cut to pieces, losing their artillery and wagon train.

When the War of the Pyrenees ended in 1795, Quesnel transferred to the Army of the Coasts of Cherbourg. Its commander assigned him to the department of Manche. After the Coup of 18 Fructidor on 4 September 1797, Quesnel was denounced by the local Executive Commissioner for having connections with persons with counter-revolutionary leanings. The Minister of War asked the representatives for statements and confirmed that Quesnel's actions in the War in the Vendée were above reproach. However, Quesnel had come under suspicion because he married a noblewoman and socialized with persons believed to be loyal to the pre-coup government. Generals Pierre Augereau and Louis Lemoine both attested to his good conduct while fighting against the Spanish and the Vendée rebels. As a result of the inquiry, the authorities decided to transfer Quesnel to the 13th Military Division. (Note: Mullié gave a date of 18 Fructidor Year VI when the date of the coup was Year V. This is certainly a typographical error.)

Quesnel was placed on active duty with the Army of Italy on 6 February 1799. (Note: Mullié gave a date of 17 Pluviose Year VIII which is 6 February 1800, a typographical error.) At the start of the War of the Second Coalition, Quesnel led a brigade in Paul Grenier's division. The division was made up of three battalions each of the 17th, 24th, and 106th Demi-Brigades, one battalion each of the 2nd Helvetica Legion and the 1st Polish Legion, 450 cavalry, and one foot artillery battery. He led his brigade at the Battle of Verona on 26 March 1799, the Battle of Magnano on 5 April, and the Battle of Cassano on 27–28 April. At the Battle of Bassignana on 12 May 1799, he was shot in the left forearm. At the Battle of Novi (1799) Quesnel led a brigade in Pierre Garnier de Laboissière's division. The brigade consisted of the 17th Light and 63rd Line Infantry Regiments. The painful arm wound finally compelled him to take a leave of absence from the army. Starting on 1 June 1801, Quesnel held a military post in the Cisalpine Republic. Two years later he took command of troops near Faenza.

== Early Empire ==
On 11 December 1803 Quesnel became a member of the Légion d'Honneur and on 14 June 1804 Napoleon named him commandant of the Légion. He was promoted to general of division in February 1805. He commanded the Army of the North from 23 November 1805 until it was dissolved on 1 February 1806. In June he took charge of the 9th Military Division.

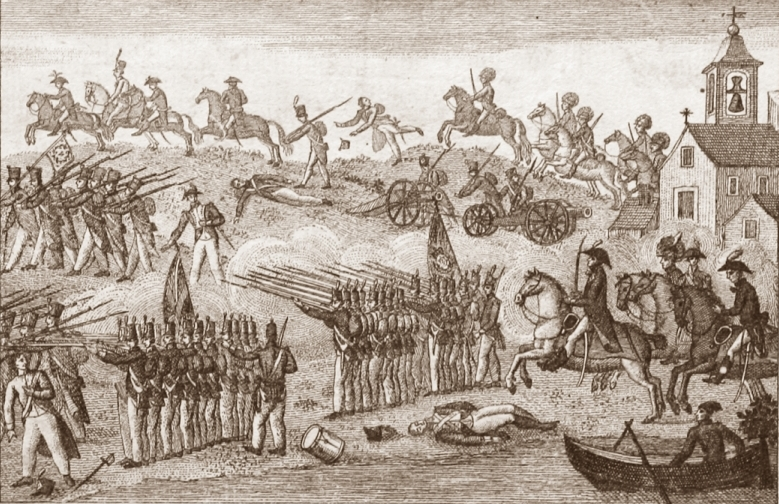
Second Battle of Porto on 12 May 1809

Quesnel joined Jean-Andoche Junot's army for the 1807 Invasion of Portugal. He was named governor of Porto (Oporto) and Entre-Douro-e-Minho Province, with authority over the Spanish troops occupying the region. On 6 June 1808 news of the Dos de Mayo Uprising reached Porto and Spanish General Belesta seized Quesnel, his staff, and his 30-man dragoon escort as prisoners. After urging the Portuguese to revolt against the French, Belesta immediately marched back to Spain with his 6,000 soldiers and his prisoners. Quesnel was handed over to the British at Corunna, but was freed when French soldiers captured the city on 16 January 1809.

Quesnel accompanied Marshal Nicolas Soult and the II Corps in the 1809 invasion of Portugal. During the Second Battle of Porto on 12 May 1809, the British army crossed the Douro right under the noses of the French. Though Soult must bear most of the blame for the lapse in security, as governor of Porto (again), Quesnel was partly responsible. After the retreat from Portugal into northwest Spain in May 1809, the marshal reorganized the II Corps. So many horses had died that Soult made the 3rd and 4th squadrons of each cavalry regiment hand over their horses to the 1st and 2nd squadrons. The 1,100 dismounted cavalrymen were given muskets and formed into a column with Quesnel in command. A few of the weakest 3rd and 4th infantry battalions transferred their rank and file into their regiment's 1st and 2nd battalions. The superfluous officers and NCOs were formed into cadres and ordered to return to France to reform their units. These infantrymen were also attached to Quesnel's column. The force set out for Astorga and fought its way through a concentration of Spanish guerillas at Doncos. Though constantly sniped at during its march, the column made it through successfully.

On 11 July 1809, Quesnel was ordered to Nijmegen and on 7 February 1810 was named to lead brigades of light cavalry. On 3 May 1810 he assumed command of the 11th Military Division. On 10 April 1811, Spanish guerillas under Francesc Rovira i Sala seized Sant Ferran Castle, throwing the French position in Catalonia into chaos. As commander in charge of the Pyrenees frontier district, Quesnel quickly assembled three line infantry battalions and the Gers and Haute-Garonne National Guard battalions and marched into Spain. He joined Luigi Gaspare Peyri's 1,500 men and 2,000 more under Louis Baraguey d'Hilliers to give d'Hilliers a force of 7,000 men. With this force, plus large reinforcements under Louis Auguste Marchand Plauzonne, the French began the Siege of Figueras. The besiegers repelled a Spanish relief attempt on 3 May but the operation tied up the VII Corps for the entire summer. By the time the starving Spanish garrison capitulated on 19 August 1811, 4,000 French troops had died, many from disease. During the siege, Quesnel's division included three battalions of the 79th Line Infantry Regiment, two battalions of the 23rd Light, one battalion of the 93rd Line, and three squadrons of the 29th Chasseurs à Cheval.

== Later Empire ==
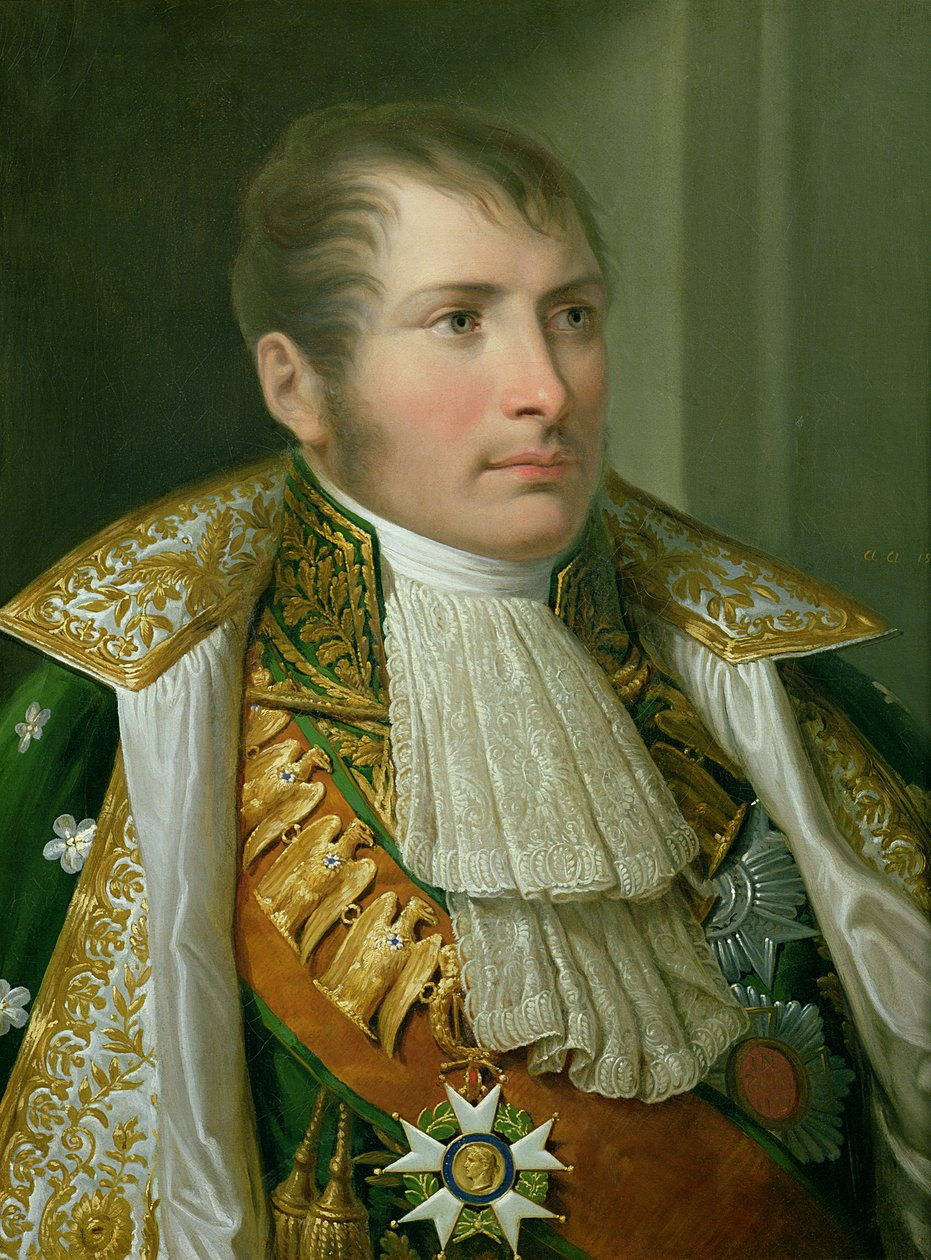
Eugene de Beauharnais

In 1813, Napoleon appointed his stepson Eugène de Beauharnais to command the Army of Italy. By mid-May the 46th, 47th, and 48th French and 49th Italian Infantry Divisions were being organized. Actually, most of the so-called French troops were from areas of Italy annexed to the First French Empire. Only 13,000 men of Eugene's army came from France. In August 1813, Quesnel commanded the two-brigade 46th Division in what soon became Jean-Antoine Verdier's corps. The first brigade included four battalions of the 9th Line Infantry Regiment, two battalions of the 3rd Provisional Croatian Regiment, and one battalion of the 112th Line. The second brigade consisted of four battalions each of the 35th and 53rd Line Infantry Regiments. Two artillery batteries armed with 6-pound cannons were attached to the 46th Division.

In August 1813, the Austrian army of Johann von Hiller probed at Villach but was driven back. Foiled at Villach, the Austrian general threw a bridgehead across the Drava River at Feistritz an der Drau. Unwilling to allow this incursion, Eugene ordered Grenier to take two divisions and attack. On 6 September, Grenier drubbed Hiller's troops in the Battle of Feistritz and forced them back to the east bank. In the action, Quesnel led 7,700 men, including four battalions each of the 84th and 92nd Line Infantry Regiments and 30th Provisional Demi-Brigade, and two battalions of Chasseurs of the Italian Guard. Grenier admitted a loss of 60 killed and 300 wounded, but the 84th Line alone lost 12 officer casualties. Austrian losses were 67 killed, 384 wounded, 390 captured, and a bridgehead. By 5 October, however, the Austrians compelled Eugene to retreat to the Isonzo River.

As the Army of Italy fell back farther to the Brenta River, Eugene and Grenier found an Austrian column under Christoph Ludwig von Eckhardt in occupation of Bassano, blocking the retreat. In the Battle of Bassano on 31 October 1813, Grenier attacked Eckhart in three columns and forced the Austrians to scatter into the hills. The 9,000 French troops included Quesnel's division plus one infantry regiment from a second division. The victory permitted Eugene's army to withdraw in good order to the Adige River. As Hiller's army closed up to the Adige, Eugene launched a spoiling attack on 15 November. While, Pierre-Louis Binet de Marcognet's division attacked in front, Quesnel's turned the Austrian right flank and Marie François Rouyer's division attacked the Austrian left. The successful operation in the Battle of Caldiero drove back the Austrians and inflicted losses of 1,500 killed and wounded plus 900 men and two cannons captured. The French counted 500 casualties.

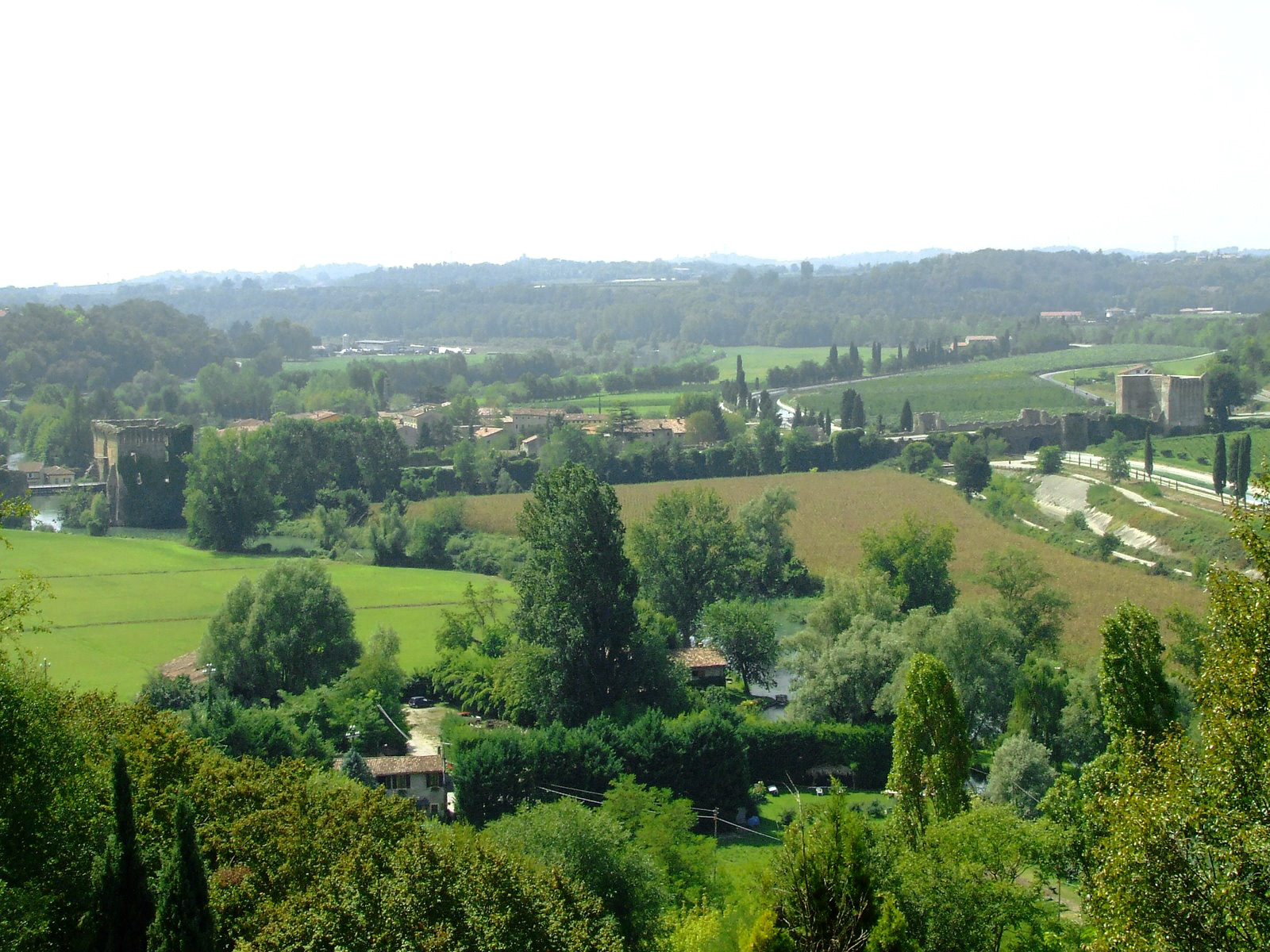
This view shows the western approaches to the Borghetto bridge which is at the far left. The Mincio can be seen amid the trees in the foreground.

In December 1813, Quesnel commanded the 1st Division which had two brigades under Toussaint Campi and Gaspard François Forestier. Campi's brigade included the 92nd Line Infantry Regiment and the 30th Provisional Demi-Brigade, while Forestier's brigade consisted of the 35th Light and 84th Line Infantry Regiments. As before, two 6-pound artillery batteries were attached. Unhappy with Hiller's performance, the Austrian high command replaced him with Count Heinrich von Bellegarde.

On 8 February 1814, Bellegarde and Eugene clashed in the Battle of the Mincio River. After Eugene threw the bulk of his army across the Mincio River, he bumped into the Austrian left wing. The French array was drawn up with Quesnel's division on the left, Rouyer's division on the right, Marcognet and the Italian Guard in reserve, and cavalry on the flanks. After brisk fighting, Quesnel's soldiers cleared the Austrians out of the village of Pozzolo. As the Franco-Italians pressed their enemies north toward Valeggio sul Mincio and Borghetto, Eugene sent Quesnel and Rouyer to the left and brought Marcognet into the front line. Meanwhile, Bellegarde and the Austrian right wing crossed the Mincio near Borghetto and were overpowering Verdier's weak left wing. When they found Eugene's main body coming up behind them, Bellegarde's Austrians fell back in confusion. The Franco-Italians counted 3,000 killed and wounded and 500 captured out of 34,000 men engaged. Austrian casualties numbered 2,800 killed and wounded plus 1,200 captured out of 32,000. At Pozzolo the Austrian grenadier brigade was mauled, suffering 790 casualties. In Quesnel's division, Campi's brigade included one battalion each of the 1st Light, 14th Light, and 10th Line, as well as three battalions of the 92nd Line. Forestier's brigade had three battalions of the 84th Line and one battalion of the 35th Line.

After Napoleon's abdication, Quesnel became reconciled to the Bourbons and King Louis XVIII awarded him the Order of Saint-Louis. However, Quesnel rallied to Napoleon during the Hundred Days and was assigned to Marshal Louis-Gabriel Suchet's Army of the Alps. He took command of a cavalry division consisting of a single brigade. General of Brigade Bernard Meyer de Schauensee's brigade consisted of the 10th Chasseurs à Cheval and 18th Dragoon Regiments. The army's artillery contingent included one battery from the 4th Horse Artillery Regiment. The only action in the campaign where cavalry is mentioned was at Albertville (Conflans) on 28 June 1815. In the minor French triumph, the 10th Chasseurs lost one officer killed. Rank and file losses were not reported.

On 4 September 1815 Quesnel was retired from the army. In April 1819, he suddenly disappeared and his corpse was found floating in the Seine in Paris. His watch and a valuable piece of jewelry were found on his body. One source asserted that his death could not have been a suicide because he was held in high regard in military circles and gave no hint that morning that something was wrong. It was suggested that certain individuals threw him off the Pont des Arts (bridge) for political reasons. QUESNEL is one of the names inscribed under the Arc de Triomphe on the west panel.

== Notes ==
Footnotes

Citations
