= Didac =

Dídac is a given name. Notable people with the name include:

- Didac Costa (born 1980), ocean racing yachtsman
- Didac Devesa (born 1990), Spanish professional footballer
- Didac Rodriguez Gonzalez (born 1985), Spanish footballer
- Dídac Lee (born 1974), Spanish entrepreneur and Business Angel
- Didac Ortega (born 1982), Spanish professional cyclist
- Didac Pérez (born 1981), professional tennis player from Spain
- Dídac Pestaña Rodríguez (1958–2021), Catalan politician
- Dídac Plana (born 1990), Spanish professional futsal player
- Didac Salas (born 1993), Spanish athlete specialising in the pole vault
- Dídac Sánchez, Spanish entrepreneur, founder of Eliminalia
- Dídac Vilà (born 1989), Spanish professional footballer
