= Siege of Figueras (1811) =

1811 siege during the Peninsular War

Siege of Figueres
- Part of Peninsular War
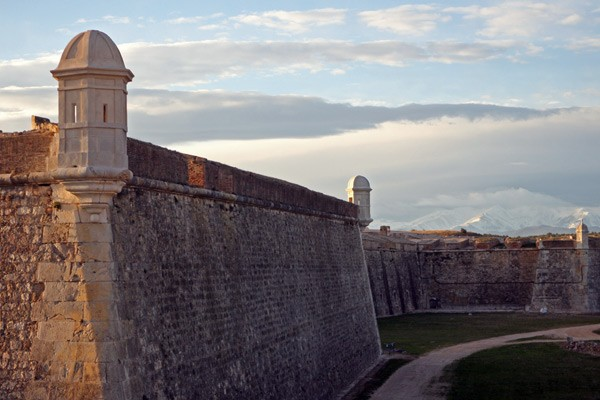
- Sant Ferran Fortress is located on a hill near Figueres.
Date	4 April to 19 August 1811
Location	Figueres, Spain 42°16′N 2°58′E
Result	French victory

Belligerents
(France) First French Empire	Kingdom of Spain

Commanders and leaders
(France) Jacques MacDonald (France) L. Baraguey d'Hilliers (France) François G. Guillot	(Spain) Juan Martínez (Spain) Francesc Rovira (Spain) Marquis Campoverde

Units involved
(France) VII Corps	(Spain) Army of Catalonia

Strength
Rovira's coup: 900; Relief: over 7,000; Siege: 15,000	Rovira's coup: 2,000; Relief: over 10,800; Siege: 7,000

Casualties and losses
Rovira's coup: 900; Relief: 400; Siege: 2,000	Rovira's coup: 25; Relief: 1,000; Siege: 7,000

Peninsular War: Aragón Catalonia
current battle

The siege of Figueras, which lasted from 10 April to 19 August 1811, saw the Spanish garrison of Sant Ferran Castle (San Fernando Fortress) led by Brigadier General Juan Antonio Martínez defend against an Imperial French force commanded by Marshal Jacques MacDonald and his deputy Louis Baraguey d'Hilliers. Martínez and his men held out much longer than expected but were eventually starved into surrendering the fortress, which was near Figueres. The action occurred during the Peninsular War, part of the Napoleonic Wars.

On the night of 9 and 10 April 1811, a Spanish guerrilla force led by the priest Francesc Rovira i Sala seized the Sant Ferran Castle from its Italian garrison in a well-executed coup de main. Within a few days, the fortress was manned by 3,000 Catalan miquelets and 1,500 Spanish regulars and placed under the command of Martínez. A furious Emperor Napoleon demanded that the strategic fort be retaken and 15,000 Imperial troops were amassed for the purpose. MacDonald pleaded with Louis Gabriel Suchet for reinforcements, but that general refused to send a single soldier and went ahead with his intended Siege of Tarragona. When Suchet invested Tarragona, Luis González Torres de Navarra, Marquess of Campoverde leading the Army of Catalonia immediately withdrew the divisions of Pedro Sarsfield and Joaquín Ibáñez Cuevas y de Valonga, Baron de Eroles from the vicinity of Figueres and moved to defend Tarragona.

MacDonald made no attempt to breach Sant Ferran's walls by cannon fire; rather he waited for hunger to compel a surrender. With his food nearly gone, Martínez launched a breakout attempt but it failed to pierce the siege lines. By the time the garrison capitulated, 4,000 of the besiegers had died, mostly from malaria, dysentery, and other diseases. Of the defenders, 1,500 died from enemy action and hunger, 2,000 marched into captivity, and 1,000 were too badly wounded or sick in the fortress hospital to leave. Though the Spanish lost Sant Ferran in the end and failed to stop Suchet from capturing Tarragona, they tied up the entire VII Corps for the summer of 1811.

== Background ==
On 2 January 1811, General of Division Louis Gabriel Suchet successfully wrapped up the Siege of Tortosa when its 3,974-man Spanish garrison capitulated. Afterward, Suchet left General of Brigade Pierre-Joseph Habert and a French garrison in Tortosa and marched his prisoners back to Zaragosa under escort. Freed from his responsibility to cover the siege, Marshal Jacques MacDonald moved his force toward Valls where he bumped into the enemy. In the Battle of El Pla on 15 January, MacDonald's vanguard received a drubbing from General Pedro Sarsfield's division and General of Brigade Francesco Orsatelli Eugenio was mortally wounded. Rather than avenge this setback, MacDonald elected to force-march his 12,000-man corps to Montblanc on the night of the 16th. From there he moved to Lleida (Lérida).

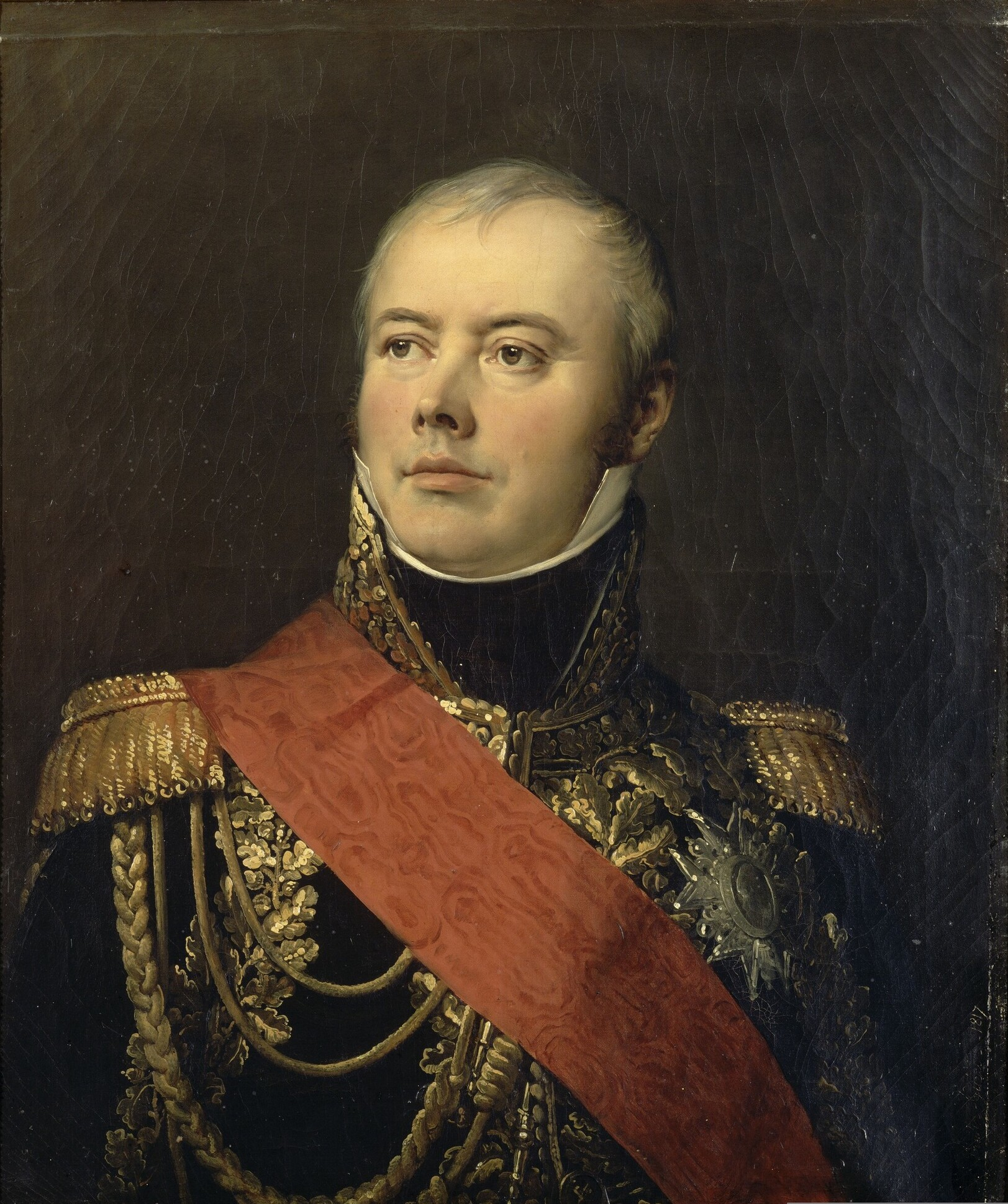
Jacques MacDonald

Annoyed with MacDonald's lackluster performance, Emperor Napoleon confined his sphere of operations to northern Catalonia and assigned the territories southwest of Barcelona to Suchet. In addition, Napoleon insisted that MacDonald hand over 17,000 troops to his colleague. The emperor ordered Suchet to capture Tarragona and promised him a promotion to marshal if successful. Accordingly, Suchet completed the reorganization of his army and moved toward Tarragona in April 1811. But on 21 April, Suchet received the shocking news that the fortress of Figueres had been seized by the Catalan partisans. Both MacDonald and the governor of Barcelona, General of Division Maurice Mathieu begged Suchet to send help but were turned down. Suchet calculated that by the time he sent one or two divisions to help, a month would have passed. He predicted that Napoleon could more quickly send reinforcements from France to Figueres, only 20 miles (32 km) from the border. Later, when the emperor heard of Suchet's action, he heartily approved of it.

In 1811, the Sant Ferran fortress was about 60 years old. The powerful citadel was designed and constructed in the reign of King Ferdinand VI of Spain and named San Fernando (Sant Ferran). In the form of a circular bastioned enceinte, the fortress stood on a hill overlooking Figueres and the highway from Barcelona to Perpignan, France. To reach the front gate, an attacker had to march up a steep slope on a road with several switchbacks. Sant Ferran fortress capitulated to the French Republican army of General of Division Dominique Catherine de Pérignon on 28 November 1794. This event occurred eight days after the Spanish defeat in the Battle of the Black Mountain during the War of the Pyrenees.

On 18 March 1808, 200 Imperial French soldiers asked to be admitted within the precincts of the fortress and were allowed in, since the French were believed to be allies. Once inside, they seized the main gate and opened it to an entire regiment. The stunned Spanish garrison was quickly expelled. Since its capture, the French had used Sant Ferran as a major supply base for the sieges of Roses in 1808 and Gerona in 1809. But after three years, the French generals grew complacent and in April 1811 the key fort was only held by an Italian provisional battalion.

== Rovira's coup ==
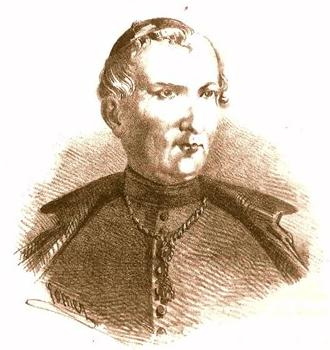
Francesc Rovira i Sala

General of Brigade François Gilles Guillot was the governor of the fortress. His garrison was made up of replacements from the French-allied Kingdom of Italy and Kingdom of Naples. Guillot was "negligent and easy-going" according to historian Charles Oman. The small size of the garrison and the governor's slackness inspired the fighting priest Francesc Rovira i Sala and the leaders of the miquelets to attempt to seize the fort in a coup de main. Rovira was in contact with three young Spaniards who had access to the fort and who posed as pro-French. Juan Marquez was the servant of Bouclier, the commissary of the fortress, while the brothers Ginés and Pedro Pons were under-storekeepers. Marquez managed to make copies of the keys to one postern gate and the storerooms. Rovira requested help from the commander of the Army of Catalonia, Captain General Luis Gonzalez Torres de Navarra, Marquess of Campoverde and the general promised support for the operation.

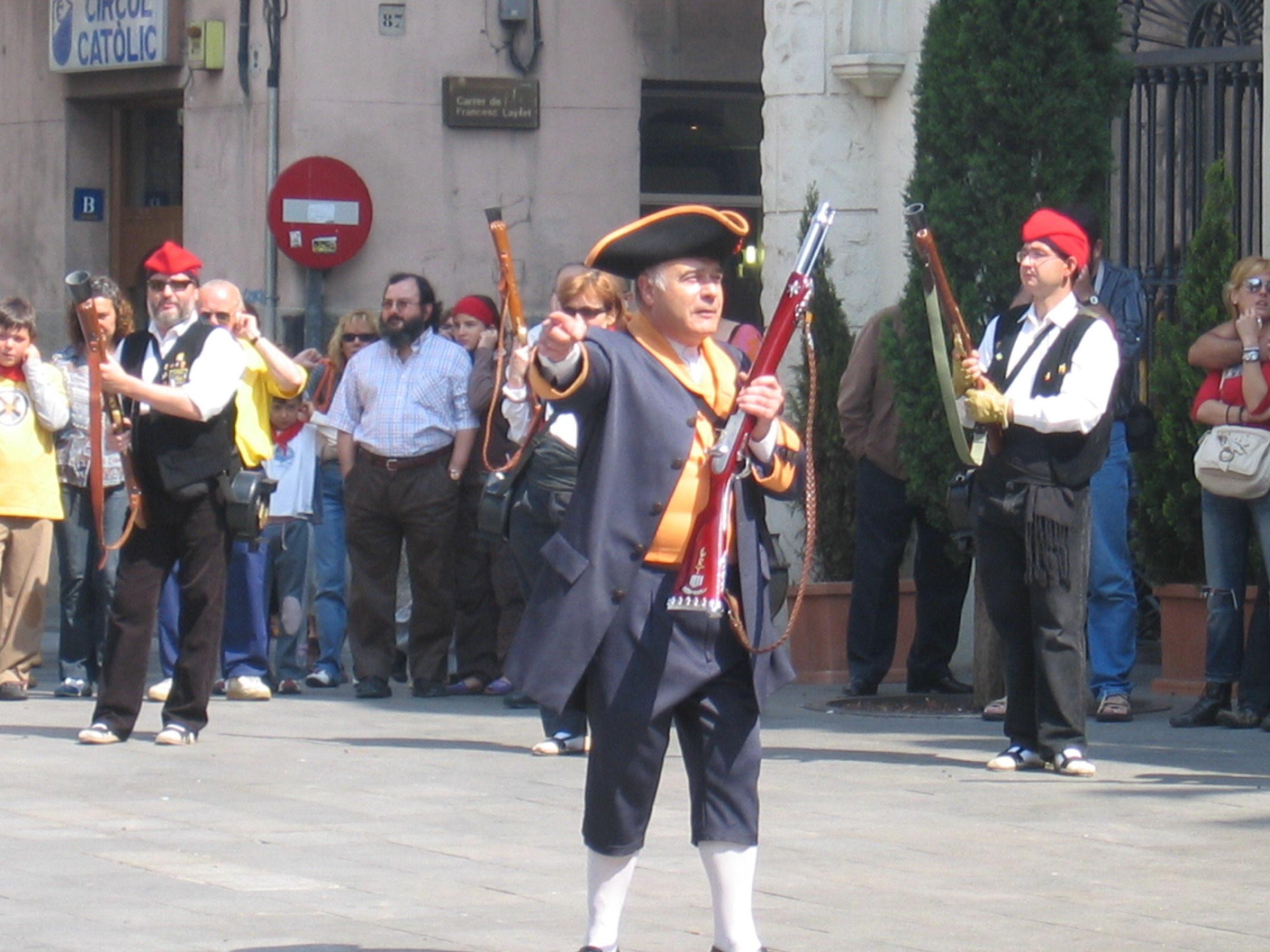
Modern miquelet re-enactors

On 7 April 1811, Rovira and his lieutenants assembled 2,000 miquelets north of Olot in the Pyrenees and launched a feint attack toward France. On the 9th, the miquelets changed course and headed for Figueres, arriving there in the evening. At 1:00 AM on 10 April, a body of 700 men under Captains Casas and Llovera crept up to the postern gate where Marquez and the Pons brothers waited. Rovira's feint had alerted the garrison and a large portion of it had been marching in the hills all day in a futile effort to catch the partisans. After unlocking the postern gate, the miquelets entered the fort. The Neapolitans who made up the main-guard at the front gate were attacked from behind and overpowered. Guillot was captured in bed while his sleepy troops were defeated in detail as they stumbled from the barracks. Within an hour, the fortress was in the hands of the Catalan guerillas and they opened the gates to admit their compatriots. By the next day, 2,000 guerillas occupied the citadel.

Guillot and about 900 Italians were captured and 35 killed and wounded. Rovira and his men also seized hundreds of cannons, 16,000 muskets, huge stocks of shoes and clothing, four months provisions for 2,000 men, and 400,000 francs. The partisans lost about 25 men killed and wounded. Emperor Napoleon was infuriated by the loss of the citadel and ordered 14,000 men to be assembled for its recapture.

General of Division Luigi Gaspare Peyri with an Italian reinforcement battalion had arrived in the town of Figueres on the 9th. He was on the way to take over command of General of Division Domenico Pino's division. After a few soldiers escaped to warn him that the fort was taken, Peyri took his 650 men and retreated south to Bàscara. Notified of the disaster, General of Division Louis Baraguey d'Hilliers sent Peyri an infantry battalion and a cavalry squadron. D'Hilliers told Peyri to return to Figueres and keep an eye on the fortress while he gathered reinforcements.

== Relief attempt ==
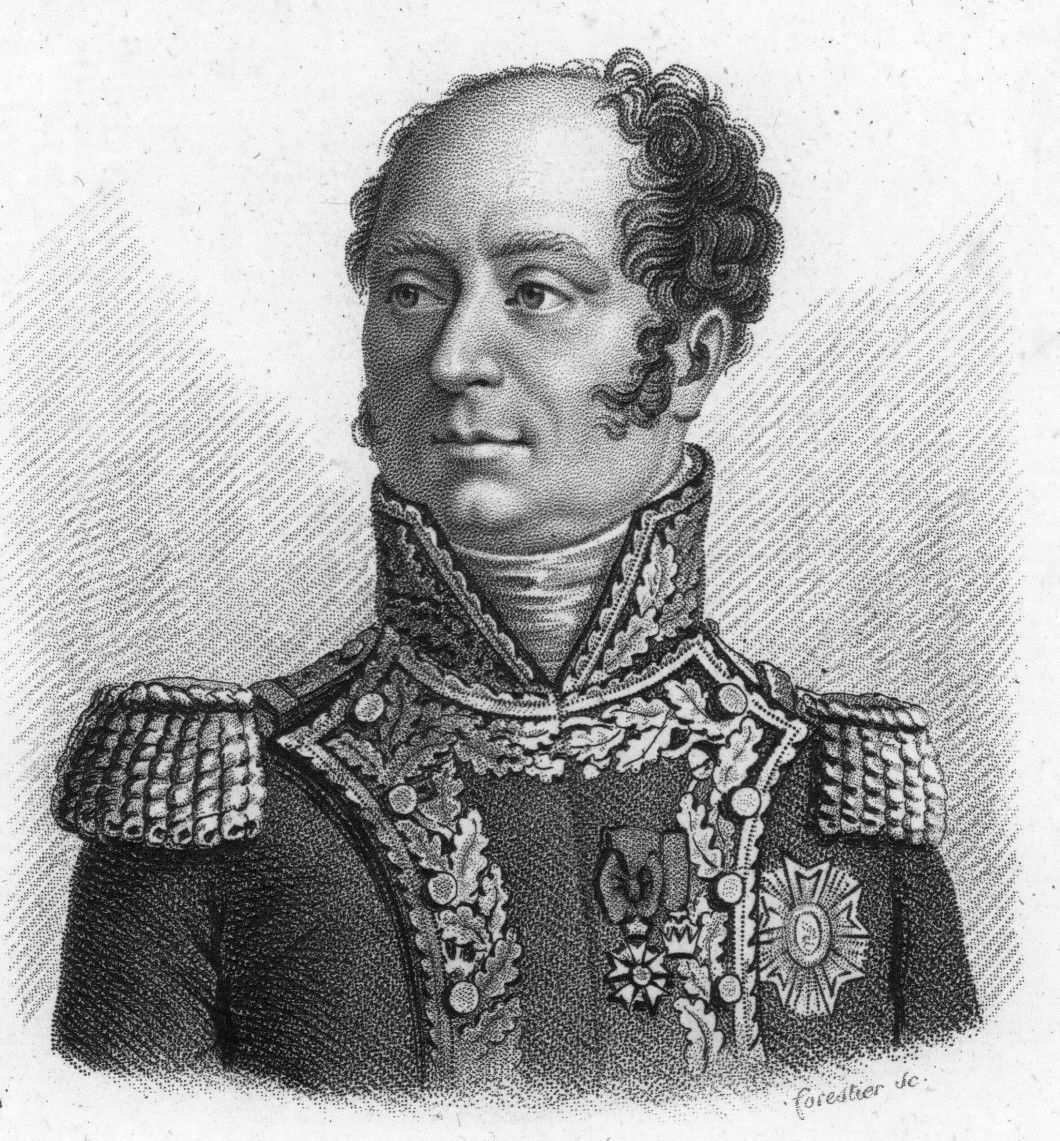
Louis Baraguey d'Hilliers

With 1,300 soldiers Peyri returned to Figueres and fortified the town. However, his force was too weak to interfere with Rovira as he brought more miquelets into Sant Ferran. Rovira appointed Brigadier General Juan Antonio Martínez to command the fortress which was manned by 3,000 miquelets within a week of its capture. Before he could bring help to Peyri, d'Hilliers had to call in several small garrisons. He also worried about a Royal Navy threat to the port of Roses. After a week passed, d'Hilliers raked up 2,000 reinforcements and brought them to Figueres. Meanwhile, General of Division François Jean Baptiste Quesnel arrived from France with three regular battalions and the National Guard battalions of Haute-Garonne and Gers. With 6,500 infantry and 500 cavalry available, d'Hilliers imposed a blockade on Sant Ferran on 17 April.

Meanwhile, General Joaquín Ibáñez Cuevas y de Valonga, Baron de Eroles marched a portion of his division from Martorell to Figueres. Along the way he wiped out French garrisons at Olot and Castellfollit de la Roca, capturing 548 prisoners. Eroles brought his Spanish regulars into Sant Ferran on the 16th. At the same time, the guerillas became very active throughout Catalonia and caused d'Hilliers a lot of worry. Soon General of Brigade Louis Auguste Marchand Plauzonne's division was on the march from Languedoc and Provence. It began arriving at the end of April and would eventually include several French infantry regiments. Before all these troops massed at Figueres, the French position in northern Catalonia was very vulnerable. It was on 16 April that MacDonald appealed to Suchet for help.

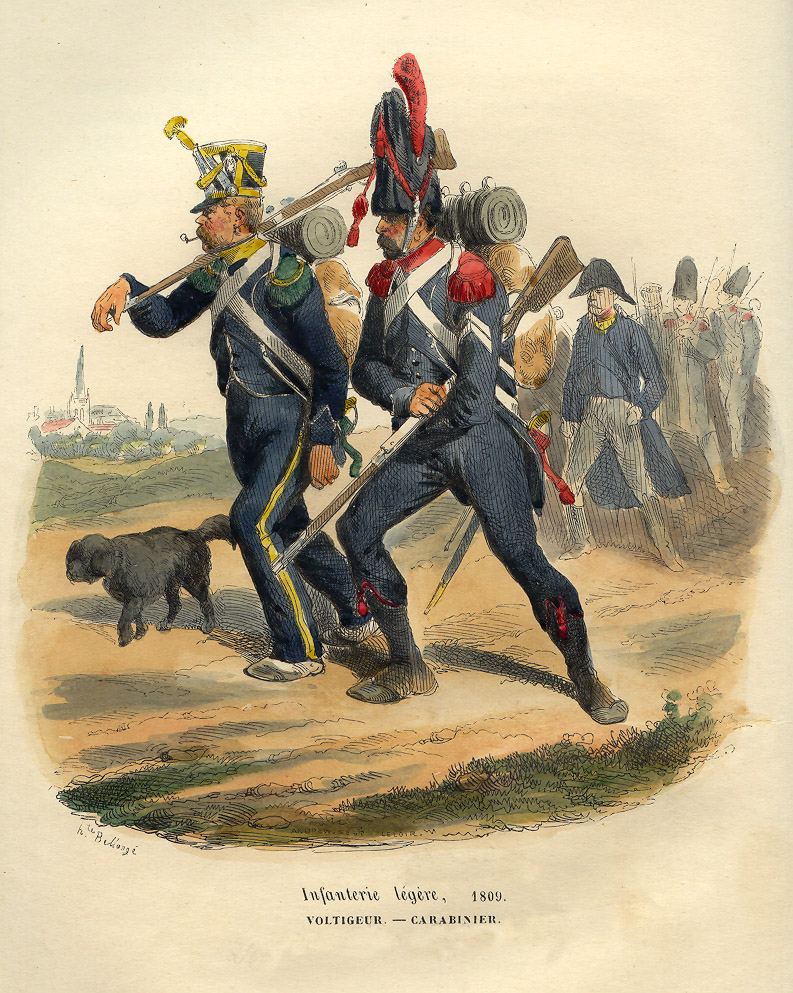
Two French light infantrymen: carabinier on the right and voltigeur on the left

Campoverde was slow to take advantage of his opportunity to cause mischief. He learned of Rovira's coup on 12 April, but did not put his army in motion until the 20th. On that day it issued from Tarragona with 6,000 foot soldiers and 800 cavalry belonging to General Pedro Sarsfield's division and part of Eroles' division. His force did not reach Vic until 27 April and only approached Figueres at the beginning of May. With those miquelets that remained outside the fortress, Rovira maneuvered to join Campoverde's Spanish regulars. In addition to the garrison of Sant Ferran, Campoverde's 6,800 men, Rovira's 2,000 miquelets, and Eroles' 2,000 soldiers were available to break the French blockade. Historian Digby Smith credited the French with 20,000 men, but Oman stated that the French were outnumbered in the coming fight.

D'Hilliers blockaded Sant Ferran with two divisions. Quesnel's division counted two battalions of the 23rd Light Infantry Regiment, three battalions of the 79th Line, one battalion of the 93rd Line, and the 29th Chasseurs à Cheval Regiment. Plauzonne led four battalions each of the 3rd Light and 67th Line Regiments, three battalions of the 11th Line Regiment, and one battalion of the 16th Light Regiment. Sarsfield's division included elements of the Cazadores de Valencia, Girona, Grenadiers, Hibernia, Santa Fé, 1st Savoia, 2nd Savoia, and Zaragoza Infantry Regiments.

On 3 May 1811, assisted by a diversion by Rovira's guerillas on the north side, Sarsfield's division pierced the French lines on the south side near Figueres. Eroles' troops issued from the fortress and together with Sarsfield they attacked Figueres which was held by the 3rd Light Infantry Regiment. After a prolonged struggle, the French agreed to parley with the Spanish, but stalled for time while negotiating the terms of surrender. At this time, a number of Spanish gunners and a supply convoy began to enter the fortress. Meanwhile, d'Hilliers gathered the bulk of his troops into a massed formation. Approaching through an area screened by olive trees, the French burst upon Sarsfield from the rear and threw his command into confusion. A cavalry charge dispersed two of Sarsfield's regiments and he was forced to retreat. Eroles withdrew inside Sant Ferran. Campoverde did not intervene in the fight with his reserves. Though the gunners got into the fortress and were able to man many of its cannons, most of the convoy was captured by the French, including a large flock of sheep.

In the combat, the French lost 400 men killed and wounded. Spanish losses exceeded 1,000 killed, wounded, and captured. The French 3rd and 23rd Light each lost one officer killed and four wounded. In the rest of their units, one officer was killed and five wounded. Soon afterward, Campoverde heard that Suchet's columns were closing on Tarragona. Since the important port was only held by General Juan de Courten's division, the Spanish commander immediately withdrew from Figueres. He ordered Sarsfield with 2,000 foot soldiers and the cavalry to menace Suchet's supply road to Lleida. Taking 4,000 infantry, Campoverde marched to Mataró, loaded the men aboard ships, and sailed to Tarragona.

== Siege ==
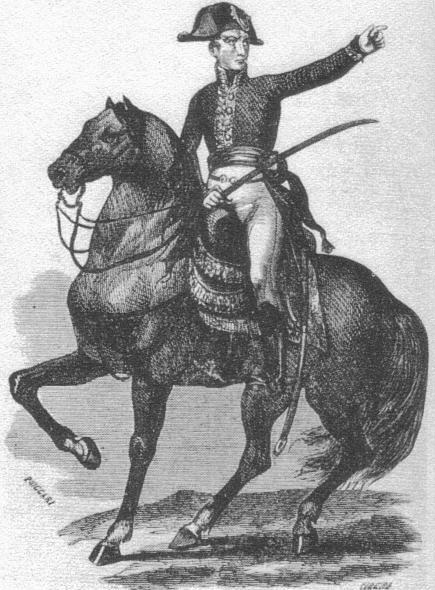
Baron de Eroles

Before d'Hilliers could reimpose the blockade, Eroles left the fortress with several hundred soldiers. This left Martínez to defend Sant Ferran with 3,000 miquelets, one battalion of the Ultonia Infantry Regiment, and two battalions each of the Antequera and Voluntarios de Valencia Infantry Regiments. There were about 1,500 Spanish regulars altogether. The remainder of Plauzonne's division arrived in May. MacDonald brought some troops from Barcelona and took over command from d'Hilliers. By the end of May over 15,000 Imperial French troops were assembled before Figueres. MacDonald began to construct an extensive system of siege works designed to keep the garrison inside and any potential relieving force outside.

On 28 June 1811, the Siege of Tarragona came to an end when Suchet's troops successfully stormed the upper city. The Spanish defenders lost 6,000–7,000 killed and 8,000 captured in the disaster. The French suffered 4,300 casualties. Suchet followed up his victory by overrunning a major guerrilla base at the Battle of Montserrat on 25 July 1811.

Meanwhile, Martínez maintained a stout defense of Sant Ferran through May, June, and July. He put his garrison on half-rations to stretch out his provisions. Rovira had gone to Cádiz to beg for help from the Supreme Central and Governing Junta of the Kingdom, but they were unable to offer any. MacDonald completed his lines of investment, pushing his artillery within 500 yards (457 m) of the fortress. However, he never attempted to breach the walls of Sant Ferran. Rather, he waited for hunger to force the defenders to give up. Meanwhile, his own troops were ravaged by malaria and dysentery in their unhealthy camps during the summer months.

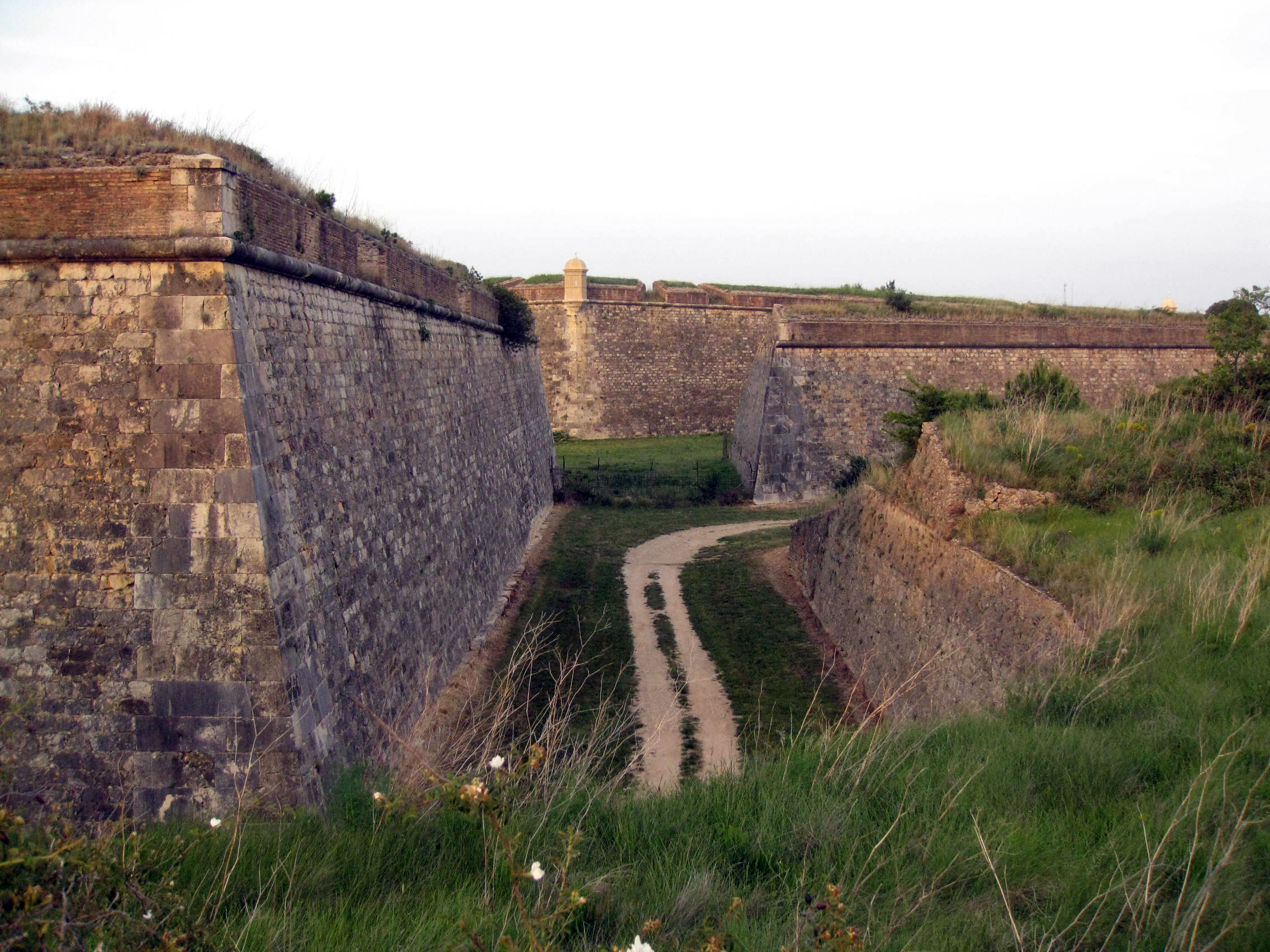
View of Sant Ferran Fortress shows the curtain to the left, ditch in the center, and counterscarp to the right.

By this time, Macdonald led a besieging army of 15,000 men. Quesnel's division was organized as stated earlier. Plauzonne led four battalions of the 3rd Light, three battalions of the 11th Line, and one battalion of the 32nd Light. Maurice Mathieu's division consisted of three battalions of the 5th Line, two battalions of the 1st Nassau Regiment, and one battalion each of the 18th Light, 23rd Line, and 56th Line. Colonel Jean-Martin Petit's brigade included four battalions of the 67th Line and one battalion each of the 16th and 81st Line. General of Brigade Simon Lefebvre's brigade had one battalion each of the 8th Light, 37th Line, 60th Line, 2nd Swiss, Würzburg, and Westphalian Infantry Regiments, plus three provisional battalions.

On 17 July 1811, Martínez sent 850 prisoners out of the fortress without insisting on an exchange. The starved men reported to the besiegers that they had received almost no food in the last few days before their release. The Spanish, however, kept Guillot and his officers as useful hostages. MacDonald took this as a sign that the Spanish might swiftly surrender, but Martínez held out until mid-August. The Spanish commander knew about the Tarragona catastrophe and realized relief was hopeless but he determined to hang on until the last moment. By mid-August, the defenders had eaten every horse, dog, and rat and had only three days of food left.

Martínez planned a breakout on the night of 16 August. Rovira, who had come back from Cádiz, menaced the north side of MacDonald's siege works with 2,000 guerillas. However, a French force chased his men out of the area. As soon as night fell, Martínez launched a massed column of his fittest troops at the southwestern siege lines. The Spanish column overran the pickets and the outpost line, but the soldiers were brought to a stand by a dense abatis. While they were caught in this awkward position, two French batteries opened fire on the column. After suffering 400 casualties, the survivors fled back into the fortress. The following day d'Hilliers sent an officer under a flag of truce into the fort and Martínez agreed to surrender after issuing his last rations. On 19 August 1811, the Spanish garrison marched out and laid down its weapons.

During the siege 4,000 French soldiers died, mostly from disease. In the Spanish garrison, 1,500 died, 1,000 were sick in the hospital, and 2,000 marched into captivity. When MacDonald found Juan Marquez among the prisoners, he immediately had the unfortunate young man hanged from the fortress walls. The Pons brothers had escaped with Eroles and one of them survived until 1850 with the rank of brigadier general.

== Aftermath ==
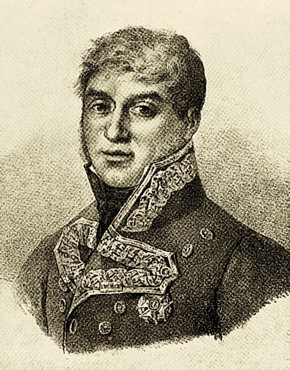
Luis de Lacy

Though the siege ended in surrender, both Rovira and Martínez had rendered excellent service to Spain by tying up the VII Corps for the entire summer. MacDonald and d'Hilliers were unable to send a single soldier to assist Suchet in the capture of Tarragona, the next battle of the French conquest of Aragon. On 10 July 1811, Campoverde was replaced as Captain General in Catalonia by Luis Roberto de Lacy. According to the historian Oman, Campoverde's "miserable inefficiency" was largely to blame for the disasters of 1811. Though unpopular, the new commander began a vigorous campaign with the few remaining troops in Catalonia. In August he invaded the French Cerdagne, provoking Napoleon's fury.

In September Lacy reorganized the 8,000-man Army of Catalonia into three weak divisions under Generals Eroles, Sarsfield, and Francisco Milans del Bosch. With the help of the Royal Navy, Lacy seized the Medes Islands at the mouth of the Ter River on 12 September. In October, he wiped out a series of small French garrisons in the Battle of Cervera. This defeat forced the French to withdraw the troops occupying Montserrat. MacDonald was recalled on 28 October and replaced by General of Division Charles Mathieu Isidore Decaen. The marshal's reputation had been sullied by his disappointing performance in Spain.
