= Barça TV+ =

FC Barcelona video streaming service

- Website type: OTT streaming platform
- Available in: List: Catalan; Spanish; English
- Headquarters: Barcelona, Spain
- Country of origin: Spain
- Area served: Worldwide
- Owner: FC Barcelona
- Website: barçatvplus.com
- Registration: Required
- Launched: 3 June 2020; 6 years ago
- Current status: Active

Barça TV+ is a Spanish subscription video on-demand over-the-top streaming television service owned and operated by FC Barcelona. It primarily offers FC Barcelona original and exclusive content such as documentaries, full matches, players and staff interviews, and entertainment TV series. It is available in Catalan, Spanish and English languages.

Barça TV+ was launched on 3 June 2020, as a part of the club's new digital strategy to get even closer to its global fan base, reaching them directly without intermediaries, and learning more about their individual preferences.

== History ==
=== Project development ===
Under Bartomeu's presidential mandate, Barcelona was the most followed sports entity globally with more than 350 million followers worldwide and had the highest engagement with fans, with more than 1.4 billion interactions. The project to create a streaming platform was led by Dídac Lee, former head of the club's digital area who visioned a way to monetize the large fan base and create a new line of income expanding digital business capacity globally by own generated resources. The idea was to group existing digital content and enhance it to market it globally without intermediaries, and learning more about the fans preferences.

==== Barça Studios ====
On 20 September 2019, FC Barcelona launched Barça Studios. A project for centralises the creation, production and commercialisation of FC Barcelona's audiovisual output, including the future management of Barça TV+. With the launch, the new digital facilities in Sant Just Desvern were inaugurated with personalized television sets, editing rooms and new offices. The facilities were designed to be rented during periods of inactivity.

=== Launching ===
Barça TV+ streaming service was launched on 3 June 2020, globally, with more than 3,000 videos and 1,000 hours of content, which can be viewed on demand.

=== Acquisition of Barça Studios ===
Years of profligate spending under the leadership of Josep Maria Bartomeu (president between 2014 and 2020) and other factors, such as the COVID-19 pandemic, saw the club's gross debt rise, much of it short-term. In August 2021 Barcelona found themselves unable to comply with La Liga's Financial Fair Play requirements, and revealed a club debt of €1.35bn and a wage bill accounting for 103% of total income. The financial implications also restricted Barcelona in the transfer market and as a result most of the incoming players were either free transfers or loans and they had to reduce players' wages to register the incoming players. The debt made FC Barcelona, under Joan Laporta's second presidential term, need to sell some club's assets, as long as they did not exceed 50 percent of the capital.

On 1 August 2022, Barcelona announced the activation of the third 'economic lever', selling 24.5% of Barça Studios to Socios.com for €100 million "to accelerate the club’s audiovisual, blockchain, NFT and Web.3 strategy".

On 12 August 2022, Barcelona announced selling a 24.5% of Barça Studios to the company Orpheus Media for €100 million. This sale means that Barcelona maintains 51% of the property.

== Availability and access ==
=== Availability and Subscriptions ===
Barça TV+ is available worldwide in three languages (Catalan, Spanish and English). It is a free subscription option by registering or monthly subscription. The former offers access to a limited range of content, while the latter involves full, unlimited access to the whole service.

The launch of Barça's streaming platform was linked to the Premium version of the CULERS Membership loyalty program, which includes premium access to all Barça digital products and services, including unlimited access to the OTT. The program is available for an annual subscription fee.

For Barça members (socis), the premium option of the CULERS Membership program and access to all content on Barça TV+ is for free, while supporters club (penyes) members get 50% off.

=== Device support ===
Barça TV+ can be accessed worldwide across desktop, tablet and mobile devices with up-to-date browsers, via the desktop and mobile versions of the official FC Barcelona website or the official club iOS and Android apps on mobile or tablet. You can also cast Barça TV+ to specific Smart TVs and digital media players such as Chromecast, Android TV, Apple TV, and Amazon Fire TV.

== Content ==
=== Original programming ===
The content includes exclusive series and in-house documentaries, called ORIGINALS. A "Barça TV+ Original" is content that is produced, co-produced, or distributed by Barça TV+ exclusively on their services.

The OTT also offers first team games in delayed or on-demand format, while matches played by Barça Atlètic, the Barça Women, the other sports teams, and youth teams can be viewed either live or in delay. It also have fully access to a vast collection of behind-the-scenes videos and compilations of footage featuring various Barça stars.

==== Barça TV channel ====
With the launch of Barça TV+, the club's traditional digital television channel (Barça TV) could be watched live in the platform in 3 different languages. Barça TV broadcasts the club's daily information through newscasts, produces series, interviews and original documentaries, as well acts as an official club's media instrument communication.

Due to the difficult economic situation in 2023, On 28 April, FC Barcelona announced that it will be shutting down Barça TV after 24 years broadcasting by 30 June 2023 and it will focus on its streaming platform. However, most of the quality content produced by Barça TV can still be viewed on the platform on demand.

=== Barça Studios Production ===
Barça Studios was created on September 20, 2019 for centralises the creation, production and commercialisation of FC Barcelona's audiovisual output, including the management of Barça TV+ since its launching in 2020.

On 28 November 2019, Barça Studios premiered his first production, 'Matchday'. An in-house documentary consisting of eight 45-minute episodes, reviewing key moments from the 2018/19 season and offering exclusive, previously unseen footage and content, both of players before and after games and spending time with their family and friends. To capture a global market and obtain a financial return, Barça agreed with the OTT streaming service Rakuten TV to commercialize 'Matchday' in Japan, Europe, the Asian-Pacific (APAC) region, and the USA. On 29 April 2020, Netflix launches the documentary in Latin America and Canada, becoming a great success and achieving a turnover over 6,5 million euros.

On 2 August 2020, Barça Studios continues to consolidate its content catalogue, furthering the club's commitment to creating premium quality audiovisual products as part of its new digital strategy and premieres El Despertar (The Awakening), a sentimental story set against the background of the 2015 treble.

On 24 November 2020, a Barça Studios documentary called '100x100 Tito' was previewed at the Zoom Festival in Igualada and received the Zoom Festival Sport award. Deals with the last Tito Vilanova's season at Barça with inedit audiovisual material, never seen before, belonging to the family's personal archive.

=== Historic content ===
The platform contains a compilation of the most transcendental matches in the club's history since its origins, 65 of the biggest games ever played by the team, such as the different Copa del Rey Finals, and the Champions League Finals played in London, Paris, Rome, and Berlin, as well all the full matches played in the last 5 seasons.

== Awards ==
On 30 November 2020, FC Barcelona won the Zoom Festival Sport award for the Barça Studios production documentary '100x100 Tito', available on demand on Barça TV+.
