= Technical Museum of the Empordà =

- Museu Tècnica de l'Empordà
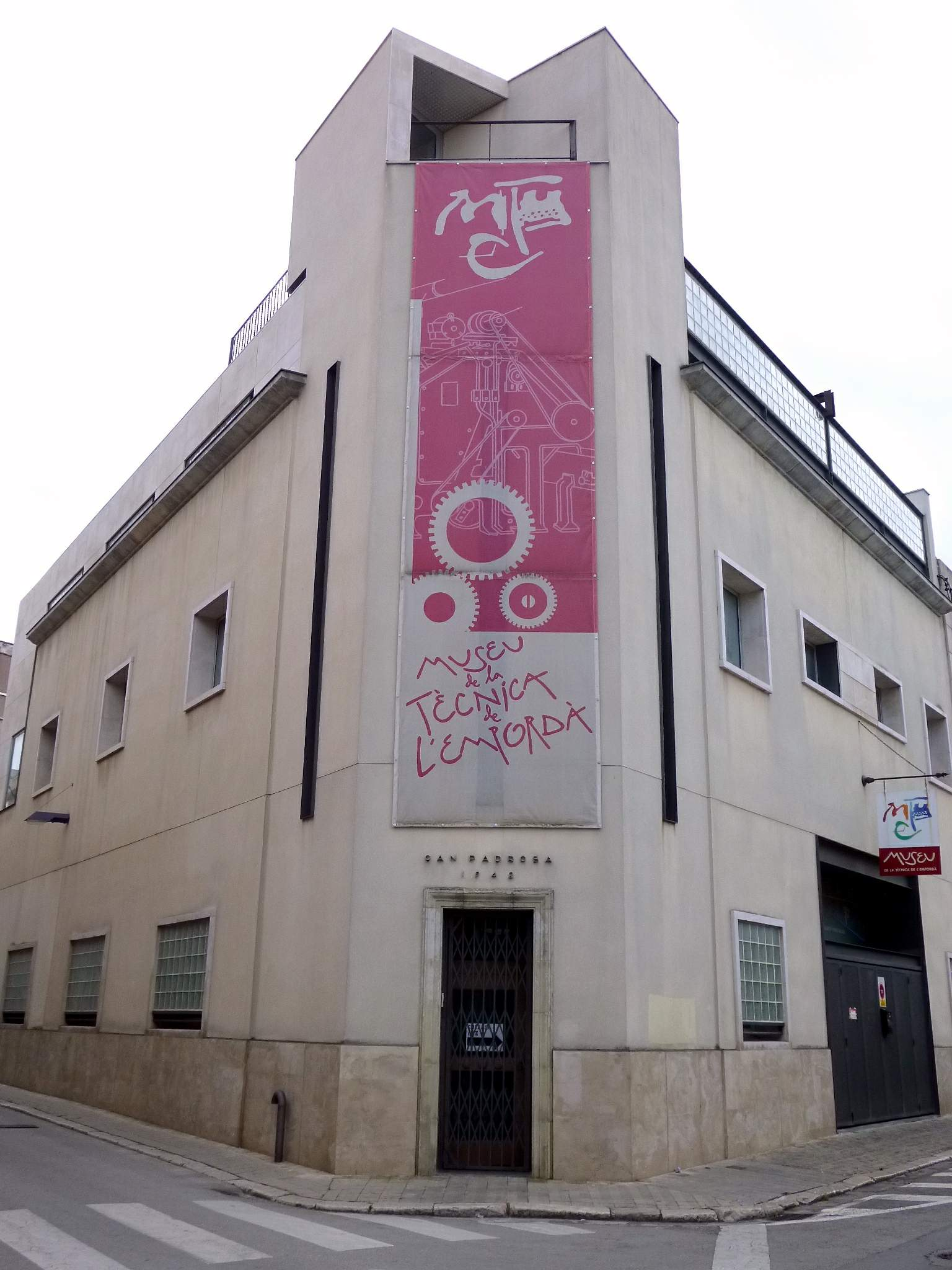
- Exterior view
- Established: 27 June 2004
- Location: Carrer dels Fossos, 12, 17600 Figueres, Girona, Spain
- Coordinates: 42.268056°N 2.966111°E
- Type: Technology museum
- Public transit access: Figueres railway station
- Website: mte.cat

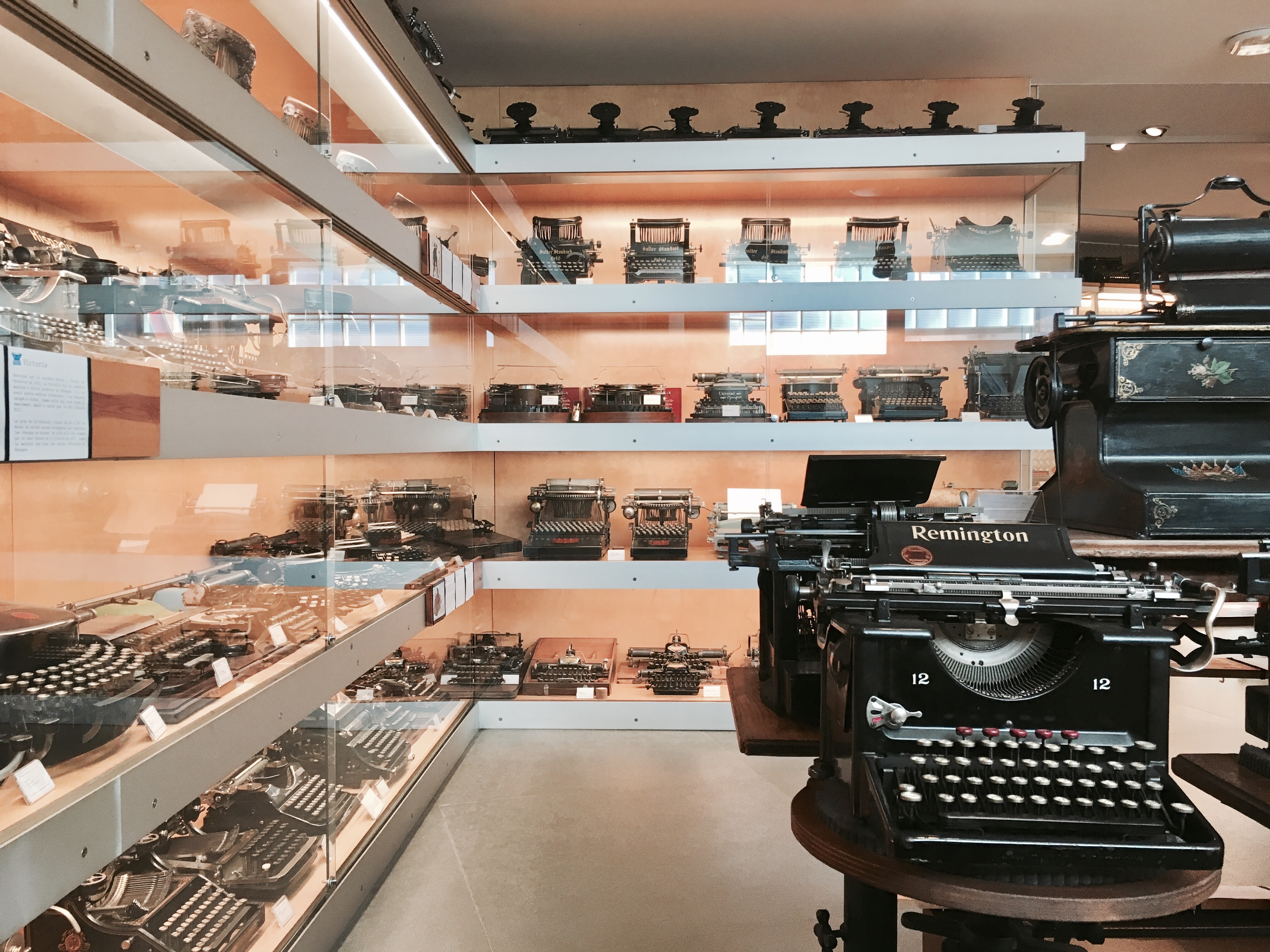
One of five rooms containing the museum's typewriter collection

The Technical Museum of the Empordà (Museu Tècnica de l'Empordà) is a technology museum in Figueres, Catalonia, Spain.

It opened on 27 June 2004, and is especially known for its superb collection of early and rare typewriters. About 3,000 artifacts are on display.
