= Francesc Rovira i Sala =

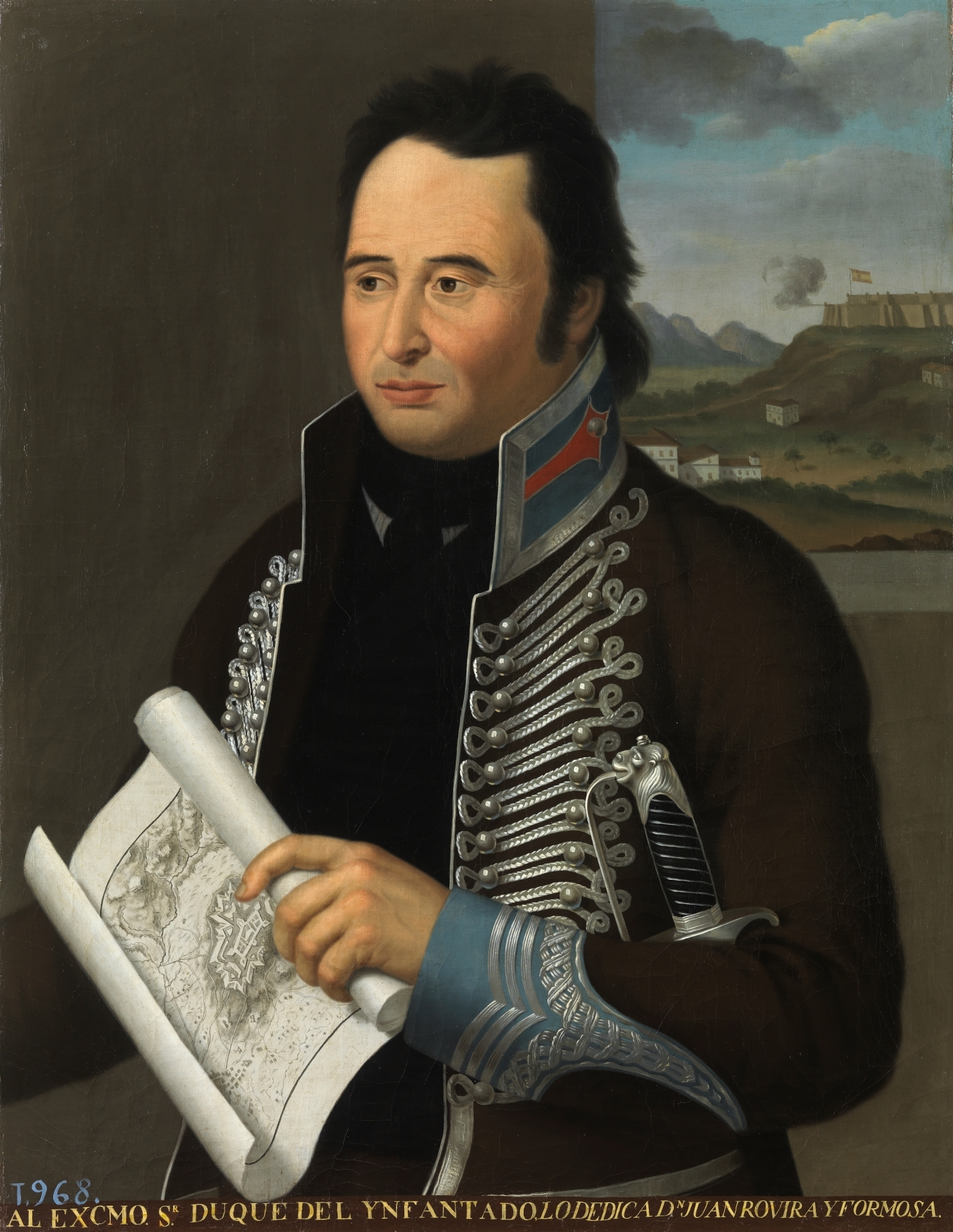
- Francesc Rovira i Sala
- Born: 1764
- Died: 1820 (aged 55–56)
- Allegiance: Kingdom of Spain
- Branch: Partisan
- Rank: Guerilla leader
- Conflicts: Peninsular War; Battle of Vich; Siege of Figueras
- Other work: Catholic priest

Francesc Rovira i Sala or Francisco Rovira (1764 – 1820) led miquelets (Catalan militia) against Imperial France in a number of partisan actions during the Peninsular War. A Catholic priest by profession, he took command of guerillas who resisted the French occupation of his native Catalonia. Soon he directed a force numbering a few thousand partisans. In February 1810, his men took part in the Battle of Vich. His most notable exploit was the surprise capture of Sant Ferran Castle in April 1811, which was part of the Siege of Figueras.
