= Louis Auguste Marchand Plauzonne =

- Born: 7 July 1774; Fontainebleau, France
- Died: 7 September 1812 (aged 38) Borodino, Russia
- Allegiance: France
- Branch: Infantry
- Rank: General of Brigade
- Conflicts: Napoleonic Wars; Dalmatian Campaign; Battle of Wagram; Siege of Figueras; Battle of Ostrovno; Battle of Borodino
- Awards: Légion d'Honneur, CC 1811
- Other work: Baron of the Empire, 1810

Louis Auguste Marchand Plauzonne (French pronunciation: [lwi oɡyst maʁʃɑ̃ plozɔn]; 7 July 1774 – 7 September 1812) became a general officer during the First French Empire of Napoleon. He was killed while leading his brigade at the Battle of Borodino.

== Career ==
Plauzonne became colonel of the 5th Line Infantry Regiment on 5 August 1806. This unit fought under Auguste Marmont in the Dalmatian Campaign of 1809. He was promoted to general of brigade on 5 June 1809. He was made a Baron of the Empire on 14 April 1810. He was assigned to command an interior post in Languedoc and Provence. After Spanish guerillas seized the Sant Ferran Castle on 10 April 1811, he led an infantry division at the Siege of Figueras. His command included four battalions of the 3rd Light Infantry Regiment, three battalions of the 11th Line, and one battalion of the 32nd Light. He was made a Commander of the Légion d'Honneur on 6 December 1811.

During the French invasion of Russia, Plauzonne commanded the 2nd Brigade of Alexis Joseph Delzons' 13th Division in the IV Corps of Eugène de Beauharnais. The units under his command were four battalions each of the 92nd and 106th Line Infantry Regiments. The 13th Division fought at the Battle of Ostrovno on 25 July 1812. Plauzonne was killed at the Battle of Borodino on 7 September.
