= Montserrat Minobis i Puntonet =

Spanish journalist and professor (1942–2019)

Montserrat Puntonet
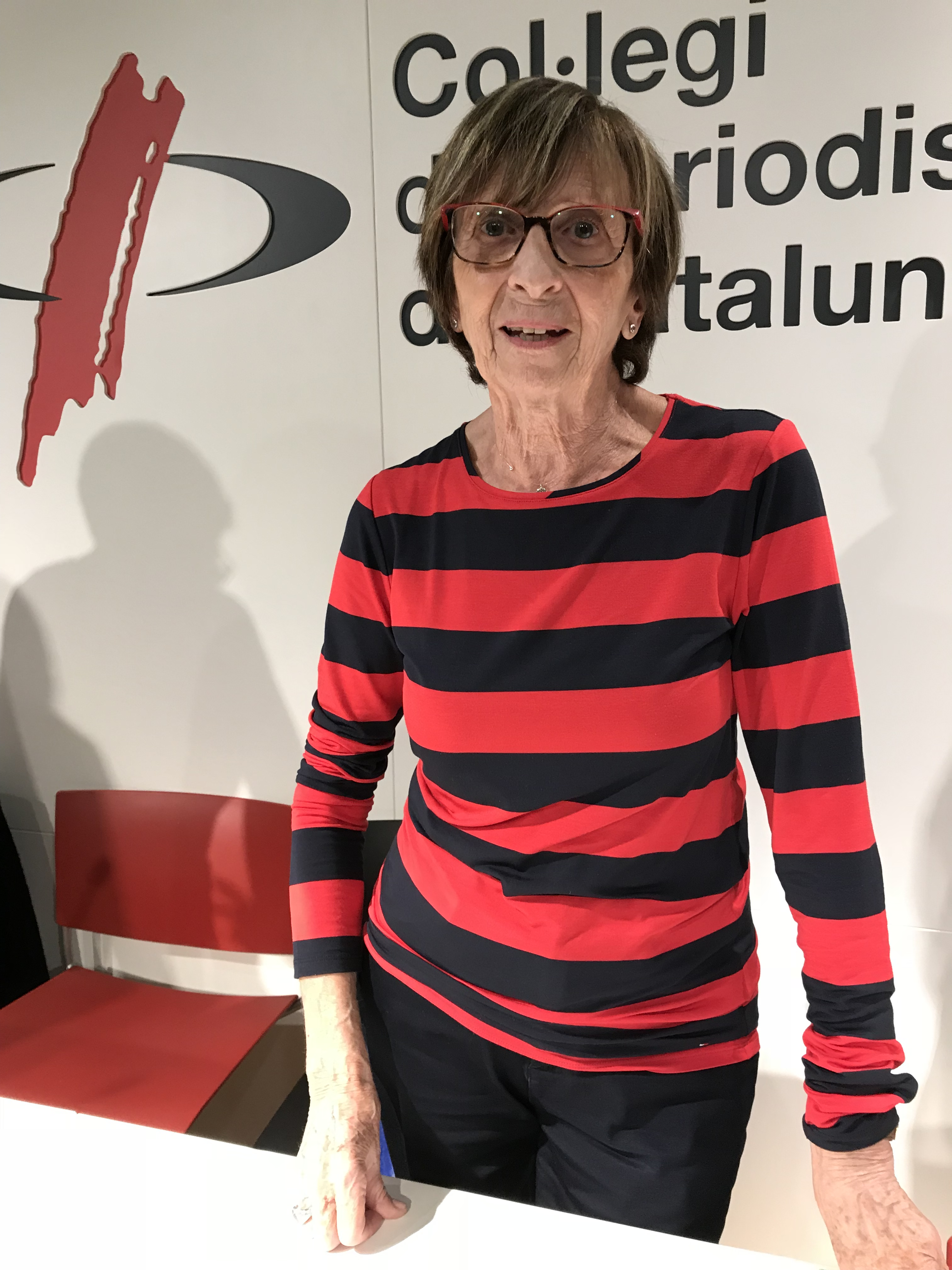
- Puntonet in 2017
- Born: Montserrat Minobis i Puntonet; 24 October 1942; Figueres
- Died: 11 May 2019 (aged 76); Barcelona
- Occupation: Activist
- Years active: 1970s-2004
- Known for: Political activism
- Notable work: Aureli M. Escarré, Abat de Montserrat

Montserrat Minobis i Puntonet (24 October 1942 - 11 May 2019) was a Spanish feminist journalist.

== Biography ==
Montserrat Minobis i Puntonet was born in Figueras on 24 October 1942. She was committed to the anti-Franco struggle of the 1970s and was an activist in defense of Catalan culture. She affiliated with various political formations. In the 1990s, she was president of the European Network of Women Journalists and the Association of Women Journalists of Catalonia. From 2001 to 2004, she was dean of the College of Journalists of Catalonia. She was the recipient of several awards, including the Creu de Sant Jordi from the Generalitat de Catalunya. She died in Barcelona on 11 May 2019.

== Selected works ==
- 1986, Aureli M. Escarré, Abat de Montserrat (1946-1968)

== Awards and honors ==
- 1987, Ciutat de Barcelona Award for the Barcelona Oberta program of Ràdio4 from RNE to Catalunya
- 1990, Espais of the Center d'Art Contemporàni Espais de Girona
- 1991, Atlàntida, the Nit de l'Edició. Gremi d'Editors de Catalunya
- 1992, Ràdio d'Omnium Cultural. Nit of Santa Llúcia
- 1993, Premi de l'entitat Ciemen
- 1996, Creu de Sant Jordi. Generalitat de Catalunya
