= Battle of Vic =

1810 battle during the Peninsular War

- Part of Peninsular War
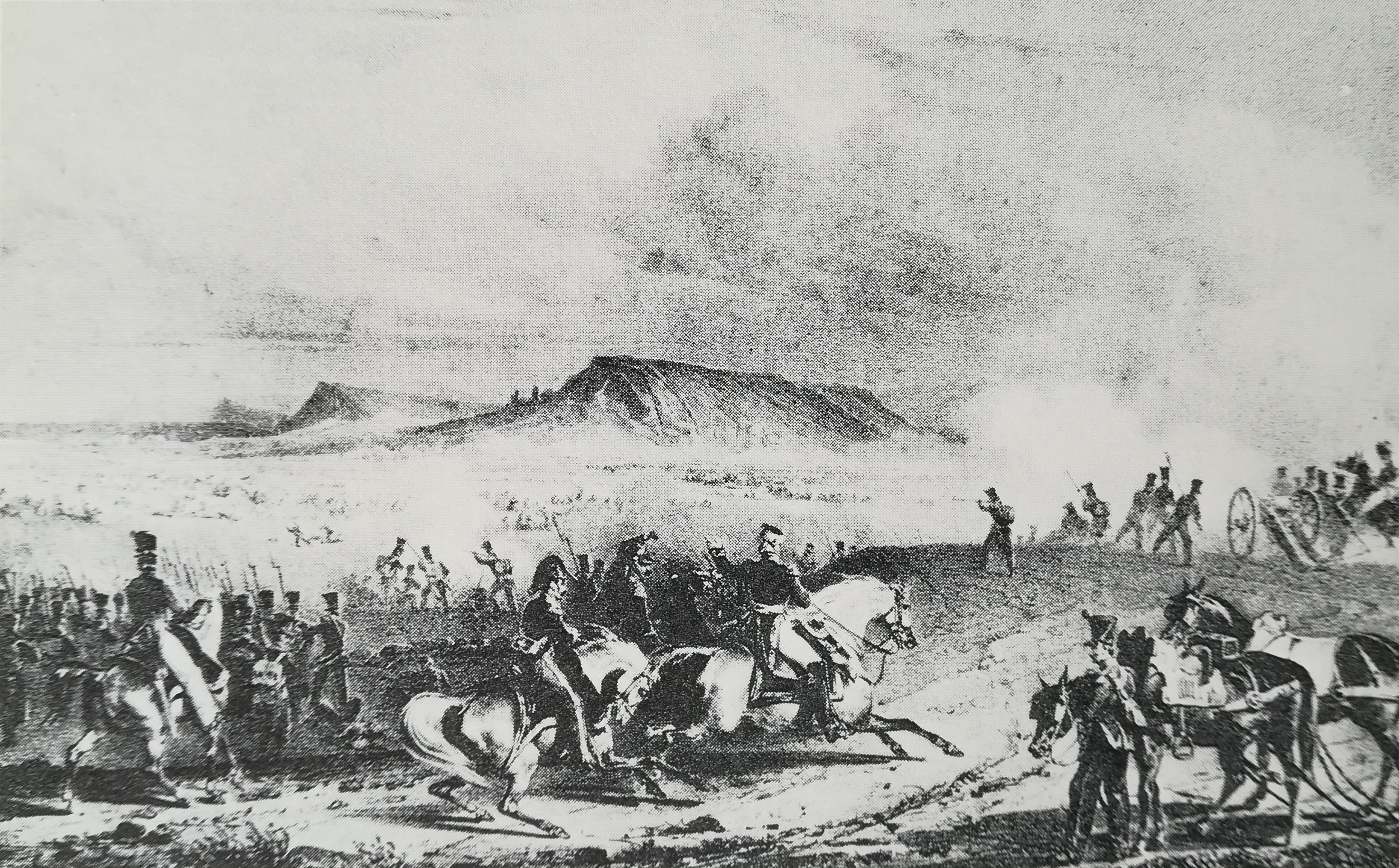
- Drawing by Jean-Charles Langlois (Musée de l'Armée)
Date	20 February 1810
Location	Vic, Catalonia, Spain 41°55′49″N 2°15′17″E
Result	French victory

Belligerents
(France) First French Empire	Kingdom of Spain

Commanders and leaders
(France) Joseph Souham (WIA)	(Spain) Henry O'Donnell (Spain) Francesc Rovira (Spain) Francisco Milans

Units involved
(France) VII Corps	(Spain) Army of Catalonia

Strength
5,000	12,000

Casualties and losses
800	3,000

Peninsular War: Aragón Catalonia
current battle

The Battle of Vic or Battle of Vich on 20 February 1810 saw a Spanish force under Henry O'Donnell suddenly attack a 5,500-man Imperial French division led by Joseph Souham. After bitter fighting the French prevailed, forcing O'Donnell's men to retreat. The engagement occurred during the Peninsular War, part of the Napoleonic Wars. Vic is located 60 kilometres (37 mi) north of Barcelona in the province of Catalonia.

One month after his lieutenant Luis González Torres de Navarra, Marquess of Campoverde scored a victory in the Battle of Mollet, O'Donnell found that Souham's division was isolated at Vic. He assembled a small army of 7,000 regular infantry and 500 cavalry at Moià and arranged for the miquelets (Catalan militia) to join him in attacking Vic. On 19 February, 3,500 miquelets led by Francesc Rovira i Sala and Francisco Milans del Bosch began skirmishing with Souham's outposts. The next day, O'Donnell led his regulars to the assault from a different direction. While a French force in the town held off Rovira and Milans, the main forces battled in the plain. The contest hung in the balance until the 1,500-saber Imperial cavalry contingent overwhelmed O'Donnell's right wing. The French lost 600 casualties, including Souham badly wounded, while inflicting losses of 800 killed and wounded and capturing 1,000 more.
