= Figueres =

City in Catalonia, Spain

- Municipality
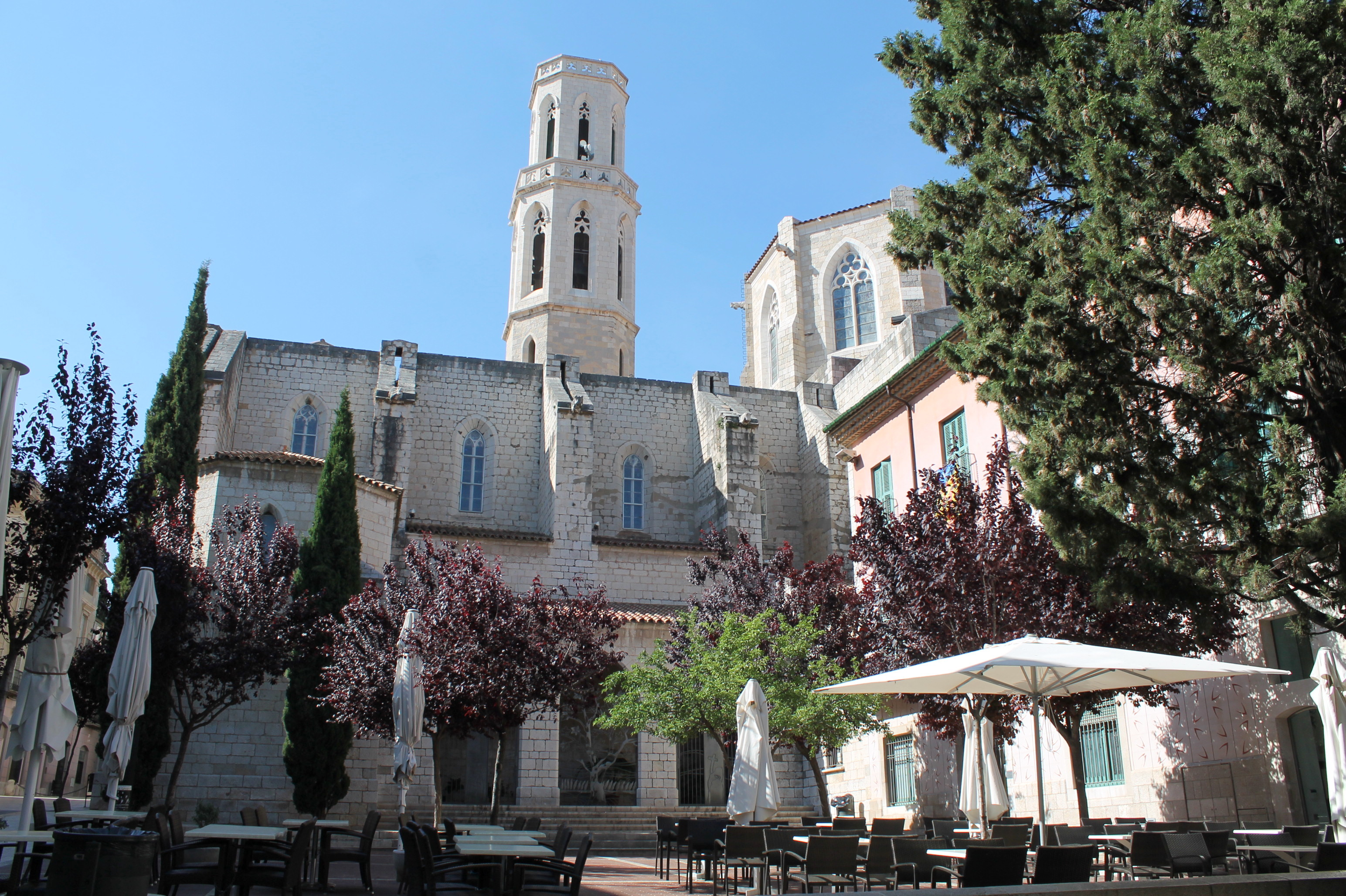
- St. Peter's church

- Flag Coat of arms

- Location in Alt Empordà County

- Location within Catalonia Location within Spain
- Coordinates: 42°16′00″N 2°57′54″E
- Country: Spain
- Community: Catalonia
- Region: Girona
- County: Alt Empordà
- Province: Girona

Government
  - Mayor: Jordi Masquef Creus (2023) (JxC)

Area
  - Total: 19.3 km^{2} (7.5 sq mi)
- Elevation: 39 m (128 ft)

Population (2025-01-01)
  - Total: 49,689
  - Density: 2,570/km^{2} (6,670/sq mi)
- Demonym(s): figuerenc, -enca (pl. figuerencs, -enques)
- Postal code: 17600
- Climate: Csa
- Website: figueres.cat

Figueres (Catalan: [fiˈɣeɾəs]; Spanish: Figueras [fiˈɣeɾas]) is the capital city of Alt Empordà County, in the Girona region, Catalonia, Spain. The town is the birthplace of artist Salvador Dalí, and houses the Dalí Theatre and Museum, a large museum designed by Dalí himself which attracts many visitors. It is also the birthplace of Narcís Monturiol, inventor of the first successful machine-powered submarine. Also born here was Mónica Naranjo, one of the best-selling Spanish singers of the 1990s and 2000s.

== History ==
The town's name derives from that of Ficaris, of Visigoth origin. In 1267, King James I of Aragon granted it fuero rights, but four years later Count Ponç IV of Empúries set the town on fire.

In 1794, Figueres was surrendered to France, but it was regained in 1795. During the Peninsular War it was taken by the French in 1808, recaptured by the Spaniards in 1811, and retaken by the French in the same year.

During the Spanish Civil War, it remained loyal to the Republican government, and was repeatedly bombed by the Nazi and Fascist Italian aviation.

It was one of the most heavily bombed Catalan cities during the Civil War, in 1938, and, especially, at the beginning of 1939, when thousands of people passed through the town on their way into exile. The number of bombing victims cannot be known with certainty, but could be close to 400.

Spain's Republican government held its final meeting of the civil war (on 1 February 1939) in the dungeons of its Sant Ferran Castle.

Figueres recovered starting from the 1950s, consolidating its economy around the tourism industry.

Figueres was once home to a Jewish community prior to the expulsion of the Jews in 1492, and a small Jewish quarter remains.

== Main sights ==
- Sant Ferran Castle, built in 1753 during the reign of Ferdinand VI of Spain, on the site of a Capuchin convent. It has a pentagonal layout, with a total perimeter of 5.6 km (3.5 mi).
- Parish church of St. Peter, in Gothic. It has a single nave with side chapels.
- Dalí Theatre and Museum (19th century, renovated in the 1960s). It incorporates a tower from the ancient walls.
- Technical Museum of the Empordà, a technology museum with hundreds of antique typewriters
- Museu de l'Empordà

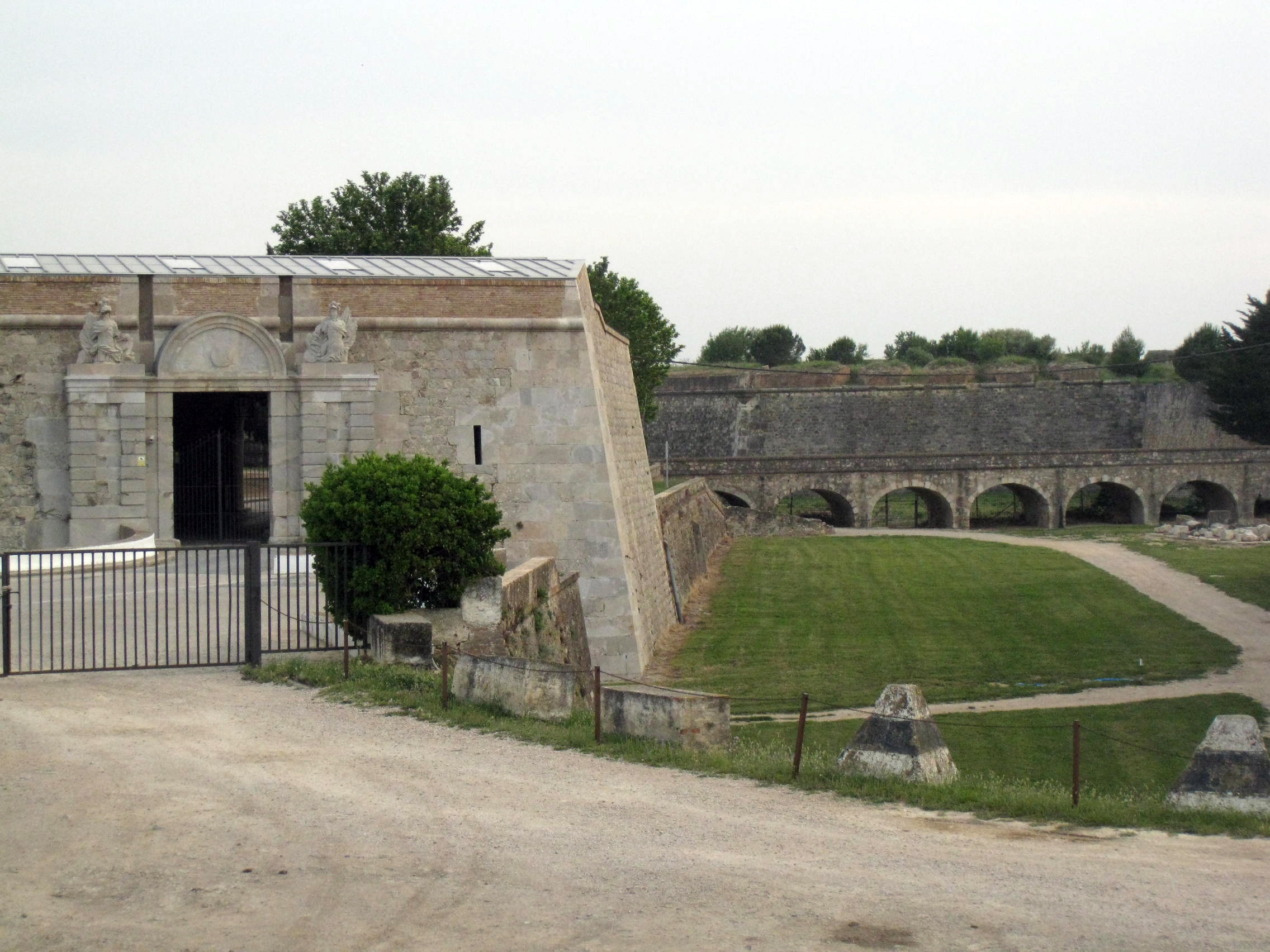
Sant Ferran Castle

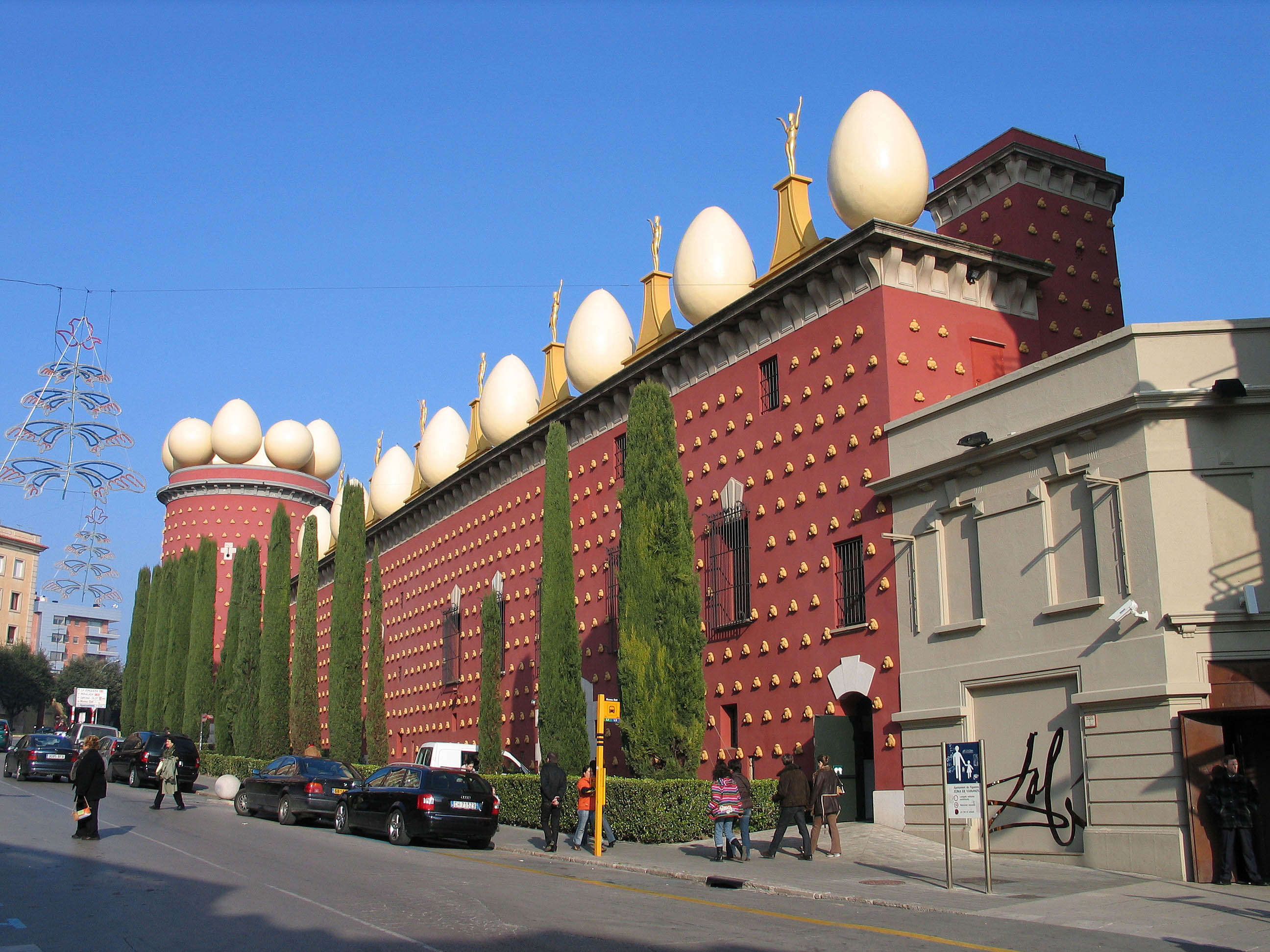
Dalí theatre and museum

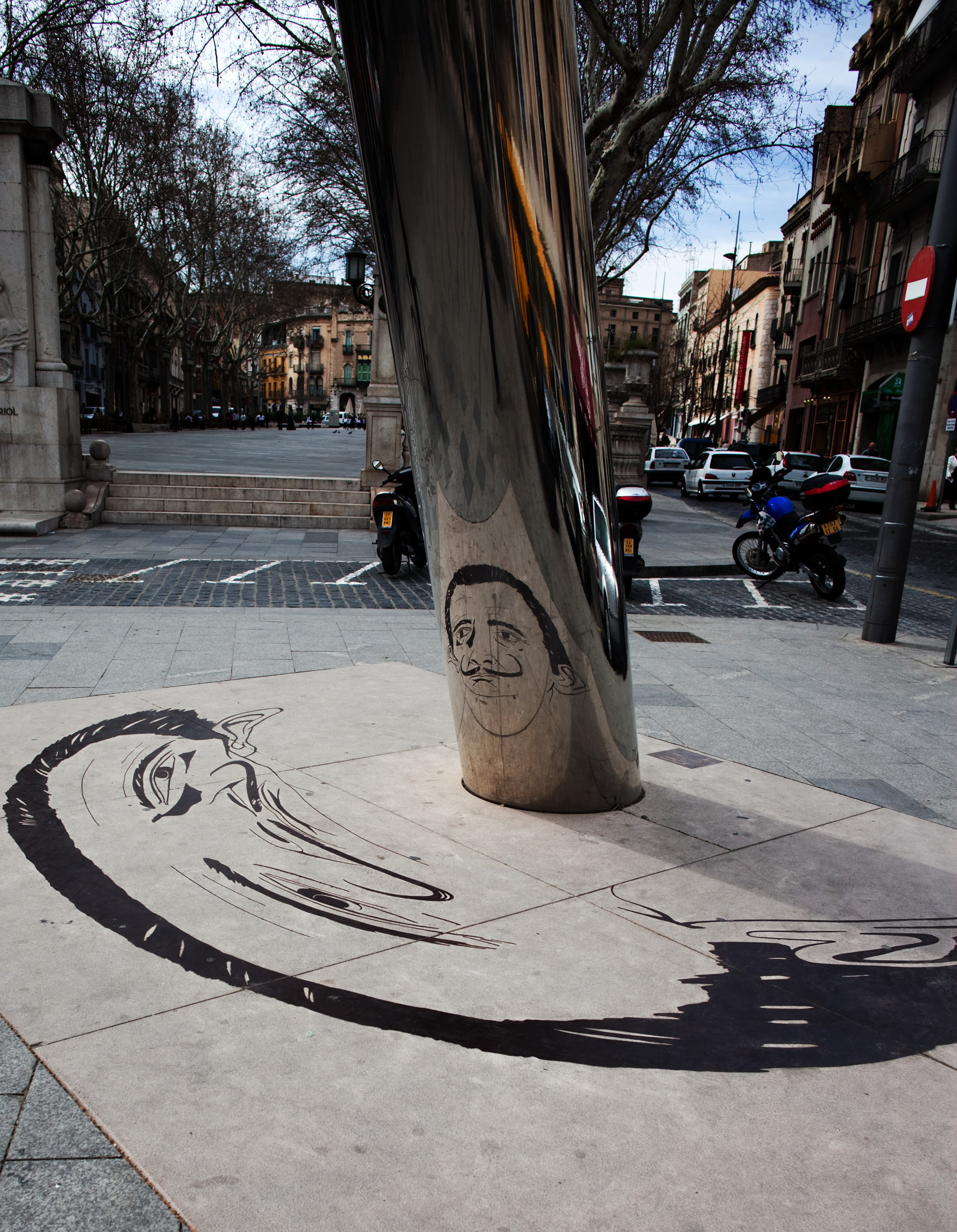
A surrealist tribute to Salvador Dalí at the base of the Rambla, Figueres

== Transport ==
Situated in the northeast corner of Catalonia, Figueres is about 40 km (25 miles) from Girona, 140 km (87 miles) from Barcelona, 60 km (37 miles) from Perpignan, and 50 km (31 miles) from Girona-Costa Brava Airport. It is also served by its own railway station just east of the old town center.

Figueres has been connected since December 2010 to the high-speed rail network with the start of services connecting Figueres to Perpignan via LGV, allowing direct TGV services to Paris in 5 h 27 min. Connections to Madrid-Barcelona via AVE began on 8 January 2013 and the trip takes 53 min to Barcelona Sants (12 min to Girona).

== Climate ==
Climate data for Figueres (1981–2010)
Month	Jan	Feb	Mar	Apr	May	Jun	Jul	Aug	Sep	Oct	Nov	Dec	Year
Mean daily maximum °C (°F)	13.6 (56.5)	14.4 (57.9)	17.1 (62.8)	19.2 (66.6)	22.8 (73.0)	26.8 (80.2)	30.0 (86.0)	29.6 (85.3)	26.2 (79.2)	22.0 (71.6)	17.0 (62.6)	14.2 (57.6)	21.1 (69.9)
Mean daily minimum °C (°F)	4.5 (40.1)	4.9 (40.8)	7.2 (45.0)	9.2 (48.6)	12.7 (54.9)	16.6 (61.9)	19.4 (66.9)	19.4 (66.9)	16.3 (61.3)	12.9 (55.2)	8.4 (47.1)	5.4 (41.7)	11.4 (52.5)
Average rainfall mm (inches)	53.4 (2.10)	53.9 (2.12)	45.1 (1.78)	64.0 (2.52)	68.7 (2.70)	46.8 (1.84)	21.0 (0.83)	40.2 (1.58)	59.0 (2.32)	90.7 (3.57)	59.7 (2.35)	51.9 (2.04)	654.4 (25.75)
Source: World Meteorological Organization

== Notable people ==
- Narcís Monturiol (1819–1885), pioneering submarine engineer and inventor
- Salvador Dalí (1904–1989), artist
- Montserrat Minobis i Puntonet (1942–2019), feminist journalist
- Montserrat Vilà (born 1964), ecologist
- Mónica Naranjo (born 1974), singer and television host
- Dídac Lee (born 1974), entrepreneur, former board member of FC Barcelona
- Maverick Viñales (born 1995), MotoGP racer
- Sílvia Soler (born 1961), writer and journalist
- Manuela Trasobares (born 1962), transsexual activist, opera singer, and politician

== Twin towns – sister cities ==
Figueres is twinned with:

- Alcalá la Real, Spain (1989)
- Marignane, France (1968)
- Kalisz, Poland (1986)
- St. Petersburg, United States (2011)
