= Didac Ortega =

Spanish cyclist

Personal information
- Full name: Didac Ortega Orts
- Born: 5 April 1984 (age 42) Valencia, Spain

Cycling career
- Sport: Cycling
- Current team: Retired
- Discipline: Road
- Role: Rider

Professional teams
- 2007: Benfica
- 2008: Barbot–Siper
- 2009–2010: Acqua & Sapone–Caffè Mokambo

Didac Ortega Orts (born 5 April 1982 in Valencia) is a Spanish former professional cyclist.

== Major results ==
2005
1st Stage 4 Vuelta Ciclista a León
