= Dídac Sánchez =

Spanish entrepreneur

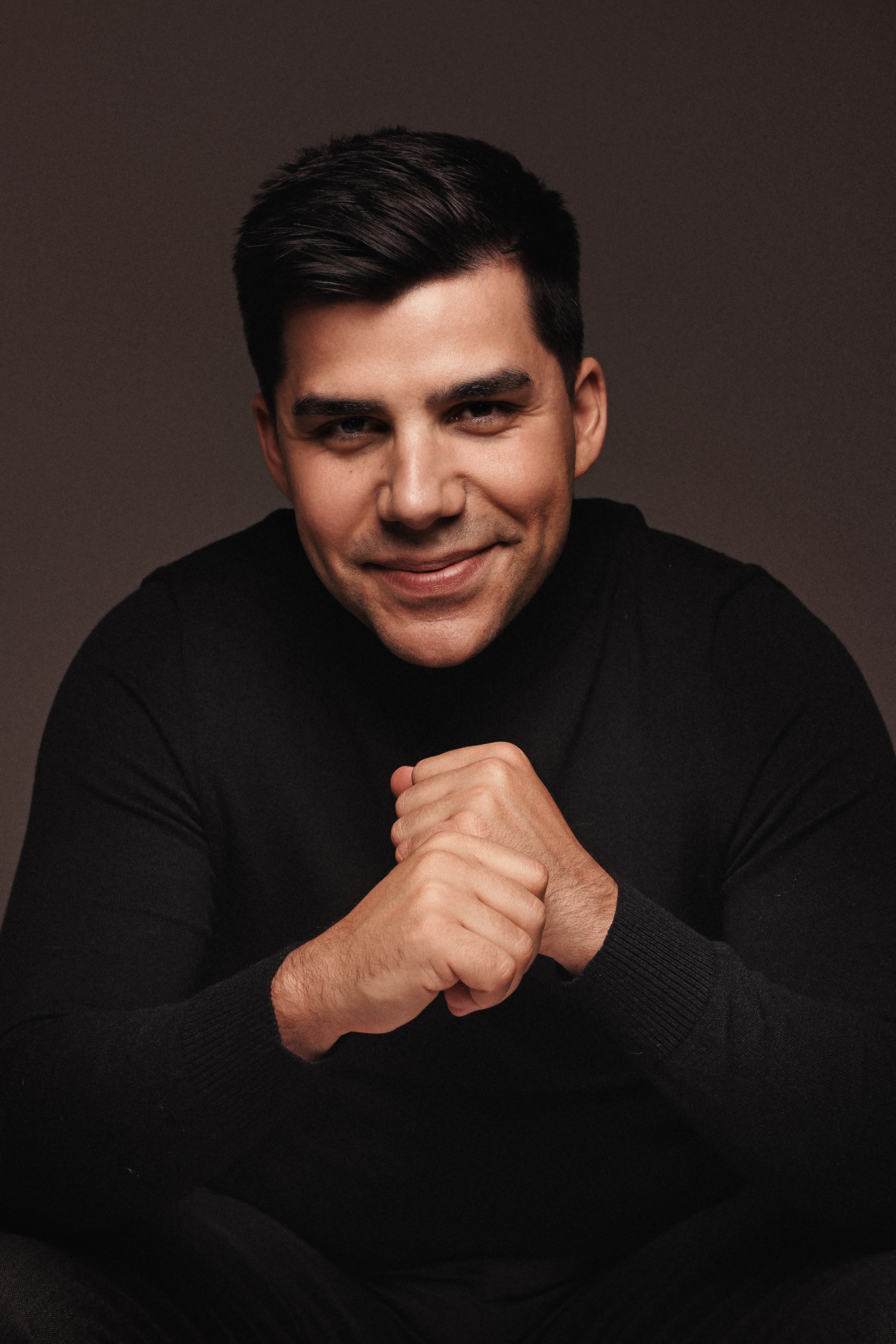
- Born: Diego Sánchez; Spain
- Occupation: Entrepreneur
- Years active: 2011–present
- Known for: Founder of Eliminalia
- Notable work: Digital privacy software, reputation management services

Diego Sánchez, known as Dídac Sánchez is a Spanish entrepreneur and the founder of Eliminalia, a company that specializes in online reputation management and digital privacy protection services. He was accused by the media of using the unethical tactics to remove undesirable and harmful content from the internet.

== Biography ==
In 2011, Dídac Sánchez founded Eliminalia, a reputation management company.

Before, he started Legisdalia, specialized in data protection. In 2014 Sánchez presented himself as a candidate to preside over the Barcelona Chamber of Commerce.

In 2015, Sánchez cracked the encryption scheme used in the last undeciphered WW2 message with geographical coordinates. In 2016, he launched software that allowed any text, document, WhatsApp, Messenger, SMS or Skype conversation, or telegram to be encrypted, as well as telephone calls.

== Criticism ==
According to the leaked files, revealed and analyzed by European journalists, Sánchez worked for more than 1,500 people between 2015 and 2021 to remove their data from the internet and from newspapers.
