= Dídac Lee =

Spanish entrepreneur (born 1974)

- 李西洵
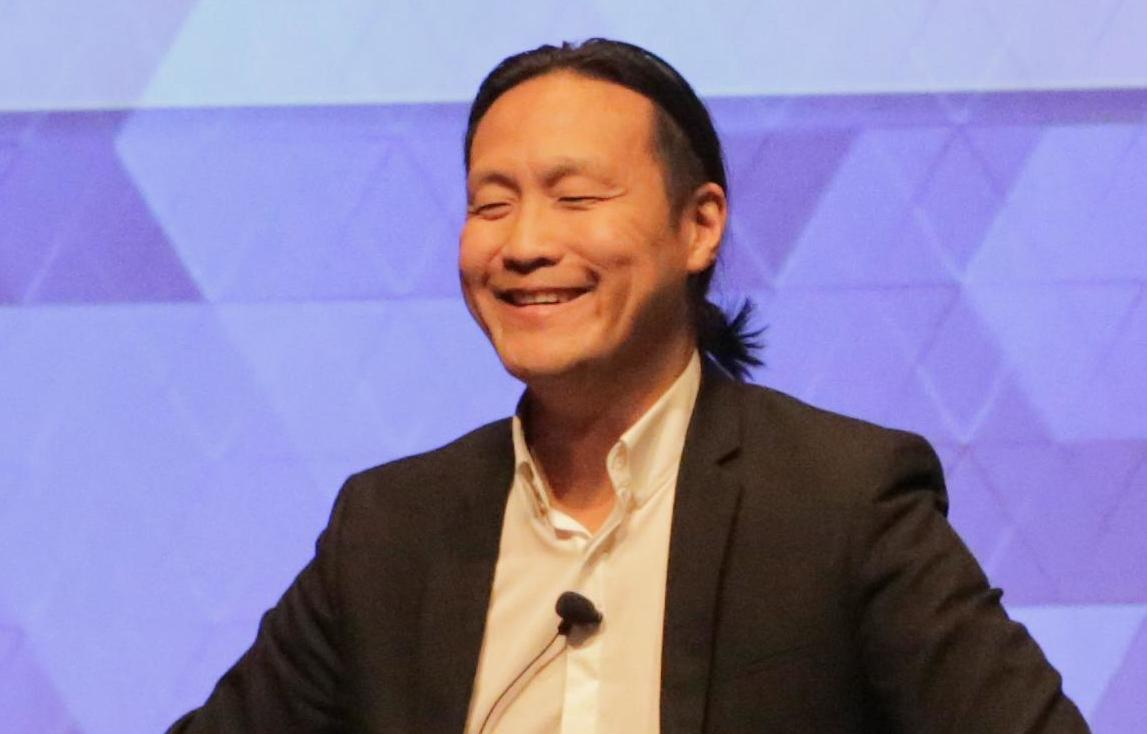
- image of Dídac Lee at a conference, was a Spanish entrepreneur.
- Born: Dídac Lee i Hsing; 15 January 1974 (age 52); Figueres, Catalonia, Spain
- Known for: Co-Founder and Managing Partner at Galdana Ventures, Business Angel, Entrepreneur, former FC Barcelona Board Member (Digital Area)

Dídac Lee i Hsing (李西洵) (born 15 January 1974) is a Spanish entrepreneur and Business Angel, co-founder and Managing Partner at Galdana Ventures.

== Biography ==
Dídac Lee was born in Figueres, Spain to Taiwanese parents. At 21 years old and against the opinion of his family, Lee left his studies in Computer Engineering to start his first company. The beginnings were rough, he had limited resources and started his company with a bank loan of 18,000 Euros.

In 1998, he founded Scubastore.com, origin of the current group TradeInn, an online store network specializing in sports equipment for diving, cycling, hiking, tennis, paddle tennis, swimming, fishing and skiing. TradeInn operates 17 individual stores, each specializing in a different sport, with 14 verticals and reported turnover of 300 million euros.

Lee founded and co-founded several tech companies (among others: Inspirit, Fhios, OBS Threepoints, JV with Planeta, Safe365) of which he currently serves as board member and reference shareholder; jointly they currently account for 800 employees worldwide.

In 2015, Lee co-founded Galdana Ventures, a 1B USD fund invested in some of the Top Tier firms in Silicon Valley (50%), China (30%) and Europe (20%).

Galdana Ventures is a venture capital fund of funds that invests in venture capital firms. The company states that its management team has more than 100 years of combine experience as entrepreneurs and investors.

Lee has acted as a Business Angel, investing in start-ups in the Spanish ecosystem including Badi, Housfy, Exoticca, Paack, Glovo, and LingoKids.

== Entrepreneurship ==
- Scubastore.com (TradeINN.com)
- The Etailers
- Fhios
- Hotelerum (Travel Compositor)
- Safe365
- OBS Threepoints
- Galdana Ventures

== Dídac Lee and FC Barcelona ==
Lee is a former board member of FC Barcelona, he served on the board for 10 years from 2010 to 2020. Since 2018, he was head of Digital, an internationally recognized reference in its field, with 370 million followers in social media and more than 100M Euros in turnover. Among Lee's achievements at FCB, one of the biggest is the leading of the digitalization of the club.

Over the years, Lee has been cited by the press as an expert in the digital sports sector. During his time at FCB, he was the official spokesman of the FC Barcelona Digital Area.

Dídac is often invited as Guest Speaker at Sport Conferences and Events globally, some of the recent ones are:

- ISE 2020, Agora Event: https://www.fcbarcelona.com/en/club/news/1609125/barcas-new-digital-strategy-features-at-ise-2020-in-amsterdam
- Impey, Steven (10 September 2020). "Barcelona first club to surpass 10m YouTube subscribers". SportsPro.
- SoccerEx Connected: https://www.fcbarcelona.com/en/club/news/1839096/didac-lee-tells-soccerex-about-the-barca-tv-project

== Honors and personal life ==
- 2005: Best Technology Entrepreneur of the University of Cambridge.
- 2006: Best Entrepreneur of the Year. Award granted by the AIJEC.
- 2006: Award "Gironí de l’Any".
- 2007: Ferrer Salat Award Entrepreneur of the Future, by Fomento del Trabajo.
- 2007: Best Entrepreneur Award Overseas, by the Taiwanese government.
- 2007: Award for Best Creative Young Entrepreneur Catalunya 2007, awarded by the Junior Chamber International Catalunya.
- 2008: Award Empordà County Council l'Alt Empordà.
- 2008: Internationalization Accesit in the National Young Entrepreneur Award, awarded by CEAJE.
- 2010: Chosen by IESE as one of 20 entrepreneurs from 40 years of the country's most influential.
- 2011: Finalist in the Entrepreneur Award for Entrepreneur Magazine.
- 2012: Entrepreneur of the Year Award by Ideateca.
- 2013: Best European Mentor, awarded by Founder Institute.
- 2018: Doctor Honoris Causa from the 21st Century Business University
- 2019: Entrepreneur of the Year by PIMEC
- 2019: Best Business Angel by AEBAN

Lee is from Figueres, a small town located 140 km north-east of Barcelona. When he is not traveling between China and the Silicon Valley, he lives in Barcelona and Figueres; he loves practicing adventure sports like quad and buggy racing, scuba diving and skateboarding. Since Dídac is currently on the scientific committee of FEDAS (Spanish Federation of sub-aquatic activities).

His parents emigrated from Taiwan to Spain more than 50 years ago, he is fluent in 5 languages including Mandarin Chinese.
