= Sant Ferran Castle =

Cultural property in Figueras, Spain

Coordinates: 42°16′25″N 2°56′47″E

- Catalan: Castell de Sant Ferran; Spanish: Castillo de San Fernando.
- Figueres, Spain
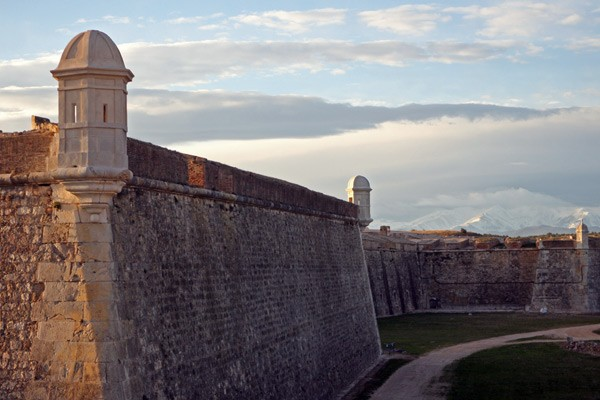

Site information
- Type: Castle
- Open to the public: Yes

Site history
- Built: 1753
- Built by: Pedro Martín Cermeño and Juan Martín Cermeño
- Materials: Stone and Brick

The Sant Ferran Castle (Catalan: Castell de Sant Ferran) is situated on a hill in Figueres, Catalonia at the end of Pujada del Castell. It is a large military fortress built in the eighteenth century under the orders of several military engineers, including Pedro Martín Cermeño and Juan Martín Cermeño. It is the largest man-made monument in Catalonia.

== History ==
Following the negotiation of the Treaty of the Pyrenees in 1659, the Fort de Bellegarde in Le Perthus passed from Spain into the hands of the French state. That bastion had been the border defense for Spain, so to replace it and stop possible future invasions a fortress was erected on the hill in Figueres. The first stone was placed on December 13, 1753. The name of Sant Ferran (San Fernando in Spanish) was given in honor of King Ferdinand VI of Spain.

Early in the Peninsular War with France that began in 1808, the castle was captured by the French. The French surrendered the fort back to Spain in June 1814, the last French fort to surrender in the Peninsular War.

In December 1809, the third siege of Girona ended with the fall of Girona to the French. The hero of the siege, the gravely ill military governor Mariano Álvarez de Castro, was captured and imprisoned in Perpignan, France. On 21 January 1810, the French brought him to Sant Ferran. The following day he was found dead, of a fever, according to the French, poisoned, according to the Spanish. He was buried in the cemetery there, wrapped in only a sheet. In 1815, a black marble tablet was placed on his grave which stated that Álvarez had been poisoned, the Victim of the Iniquity of the French Tyrant. In December 1823 French troops passed through Figueres again, intervening in Spain to restore the Bourbon throne of Ferdinand VII. On the orders of Marshal Moncey, formerly Napoleon's Inspector-General of Police, the marble plaque was destroyed.

On 1 February 1939, Juan Negrín, last prime minister of the Second Spanish Republic, convened in the castle the final meeting on Spanish soil of the Republican Spanish Cortes. A week later, the fortress fell to the forces of Francisco Franco.

From May 1940 to December 1942, the Francoist regime used the castle as a concentration camp where returned republicans from France were held. Thousands of prisoners were interned there, most of them to be distributed to other camps.

== Architecture ==
The castle occupies an area of 320,000 m^{2} within a perimeter of 3120 m, and cisterns located under the courtyard are able to hold up to 10 million liters of water. At its height, the castle could support 6,000 troops.

After it ceased to be used as a prison in July 1997, it was opened to the public with guided tours to show the characteristics of the fortress. These tours emphasize the sophisticated construction techniques from the military engineering of the time.

== Connections ==
The castle, being situated in the north-west of the town, is more accessible to tourists these days, since the Figueres Vilafant station has opened on the western edge of the town (the existing station is to the east of the centre). The castle is a little over 500m from Figueres-Vilafant station (using a footpath).

== See also ==
- Timeline of the Peninsular War
