= François Xavier de Schwarz =

French general (1762–1826)

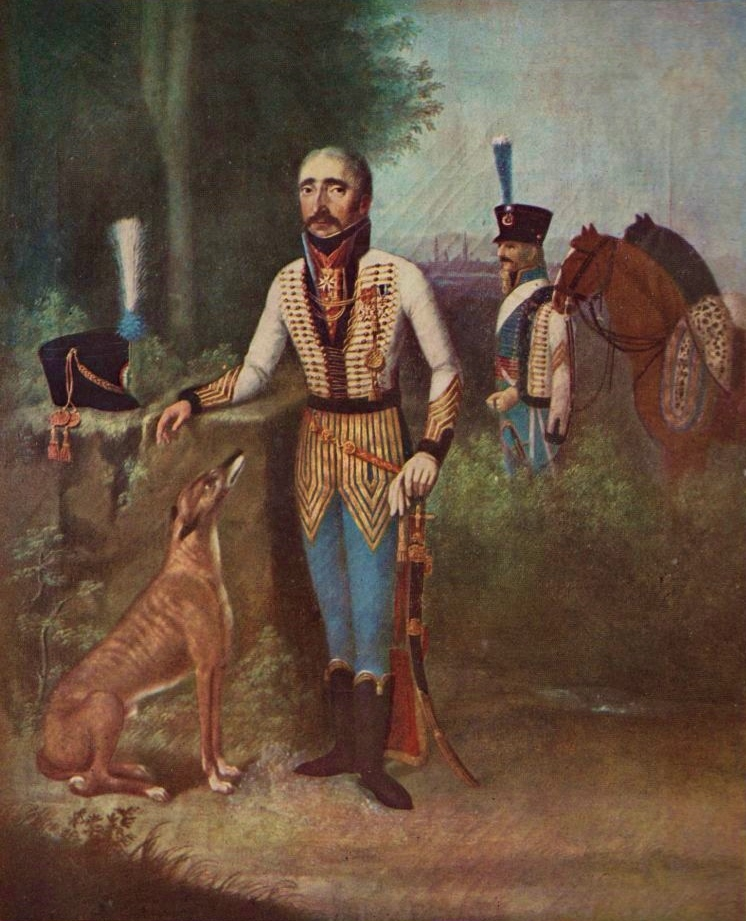
- François Xavier de Schwarz as Colonel of the 5th Hussar Regiment. Painting by Revel, 19th century.
- Born: 8 January 1762; Baden
- Died: 9 October 1826 (aged 64)
- Military career
- Allegiance: France
- Branch: Cavalry, Infantry
- Rank: General of Brigade
- Conflicts: Irish Rebellion of 1798; Battle of Tory Island (POW); War of the Second Coalition; Battle of Messkirch; Battle of Biberach; Battle of Hohenlinden; War of the Third Coalition; Battle of Austerlitz; War of the Fourth Coalition; Battle of Prenzlau; Capitulation of Stettin; Battle of Golymin; Peninsular War; Battles of the Bruch; Battle of Manresa; Battle of La Bisbal (POW)
- Awards: Légion d'Honneur, CC 1805
- Other work: Baron of the Empire, 1808

François Xavier de Schwarz or François-Xavier-Nicolas Schwartz (French pronunciation: [fʁɑ̃swa ɡzavje nikɔlɑ də ʃvaʁts]; 8 January 1762 – 9 October 1826) was born in Baden but joined the French army in 1776. He became a cavalry officer during the French Revolutionary Wars, fighting with the 2nd Hussar Regiment in numerous actions including Jemappes, Fleurus, and Neuwied. After being captured in an abortive invasion of Ireland, he was promoted to command the 5th Hussar Regiment. He led the unit in the War of the Second Coalition, most notably at Hohenlinden and in the subsequent pursuit of the Austrians.

Under the First French Empire, he distinguished himself at Austerlitz in December 1805. A year later he became brigadier general after fighting at Prenzlau, Stettin, and Golymin. After being posted to Spain to fight in the Peninsular War, he suffered defeats at the hands of the Spanish forces in Catalonia at Bruch Pass and Manresa. In September 1810 he was captured at La Bisbal and spent the remainder of the Napoleonic Wars in British custody. Historian Charles Oman called Schwarz unlucky.

== Revolution ==
Schwarz was born in Hernwiess, in the Margraviate of Baden on 8 January 1762, the son of a baron of the Holy Roman Empire and entered French military service in 1776. He served as an officer of the 2nd Hussar Regiment in the War of the First Coalition. Three squadrons of the 2nd Hussars participated in the Battle of Valmy on 20 September 1792 as part of the Flankers of the Left contingent. On 6 November 1792, the regiment fought at the Battle of Jemappes in the Avantgarde of Pierre de Ruel, marquis de Beurnonville's Right Wing. The 2nd was present at the Battle of Hondschoote on 6 to 8 September 1793 and the Second Battle of Wissembourg at the end of the year.

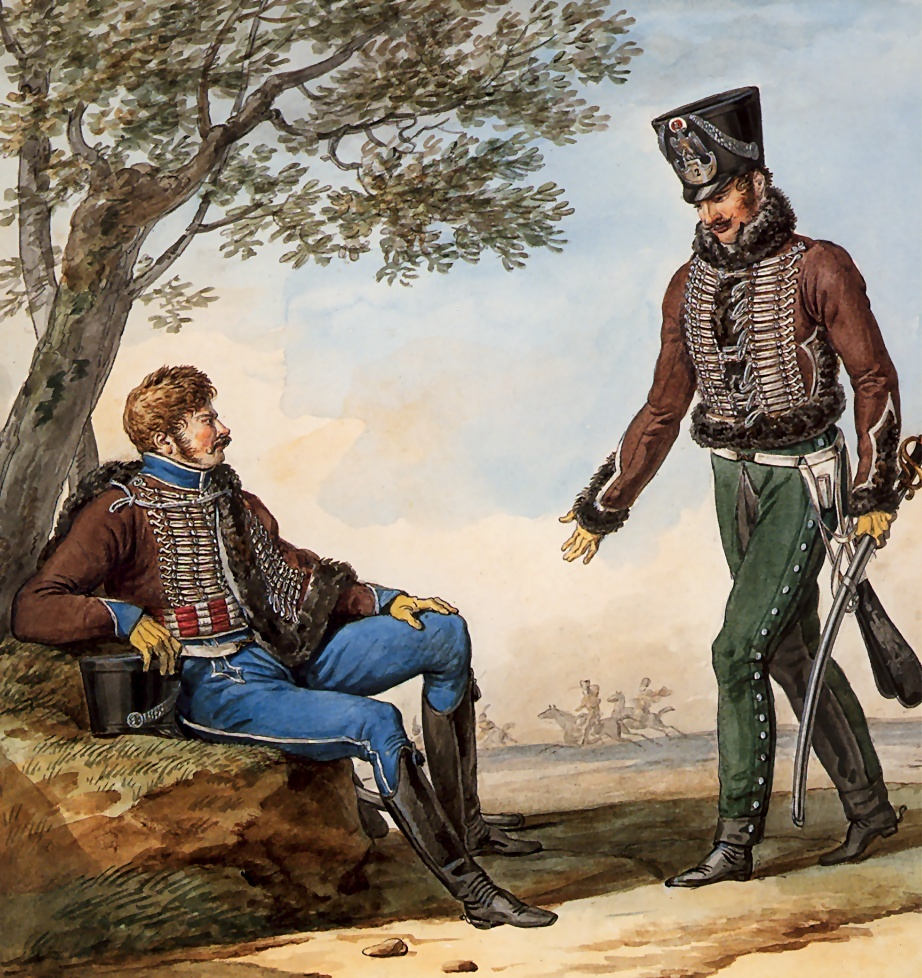
2nd Hussar Regiment in 1812 with colors unchanged since the 1790s

On 3 June 1794, the 2nd Hussars formed part of the command of Jacques Desjardin. The unit counted 265 sabers. On 26 June 1794, two squadrons of the 2nd Hussars fought at the Battle of Fleurus in a cavalry brigade led by Jean-Joseph Ange d'Hautpoul. The 2nd participated in the siege and capture of Venlo on 27 October and Maastricht on 4 November 1794. The latter action was overseen by Jean Baptiste Kleber. The regiment helped seize the Dutch fleet at Texel in the subsequent winter. On 1 October 1795, the 2nd Hussars were part of Jean-Baptiste Bernadotte's division in the Army of Sambre-et-Meuse. The 2nd Hussars also fought at the Battle of Neuwied on 18 April 1797.

As part of the French intervention in the Irish Rebellion of 1798, Schwarz sailed there with a contingent of troops but was captured on 12 October 1798 at the Battle of Tory Island. Schwarz was promoted chef de brigade (colonel) of the 5th Hussar Regiment on 3 September 1799. In the 1800 spring campaign in southern Germany, his regiment was assigned to General of Division Antoine Richepanse's division. The 5th Hussars fought at the Battle of Messkirch on 4 and 5 May, at the Battle of Biberach on 9 May, and at Kirchberg an der Iller.

After the armistice lapsed, the 596-strong 5th Hussars fought at the Battle of Hohenlinden on 3 December 1800 as part of Richepanse's division. As the division made its flank march into the Austrian left-rear, a force of Austrian grenadiers attacked the center of the column, breaking it in two. General of Brigade Jean-Baptiste Drouet, leading the trailing half, sent the 5th Hussars supported by some infantry to push back the Austrians. While Drouet, General of Brigade Louis Michel Antoine Sahuc, and the 5th Hussars became embroiled in a struggle with the grenadiers, Richepanse directed his two leading regiments to swing left directly into the rear of Archduke John of Austria's army. This decisive blow demolished the Austro-Bavarian left-center column, winning the battle. Between 16 and 19 December, Richepanse led his division in several actions against the Austrian rear guards. The 5th Hussars fought at Neumarkt am Wallersee on the 16th where 7,000 French inflicted 500 casualties on Franz Löpper's 3,700 Austrians, at Frankenmarkt on the 17th where 6,000 French captured 2,650 out of 4,000 troops in Michael von Kienmayer's column, at Schwanenstadt on the 18th where 2,000 French cavalry attacked Johann Sigismund Riesch's Austrians and forced the surrender of 700 horsemen from the Lothringen Cuirassier Regiment Nr. 7, and at Lambach on the 19th where 5,000 French overran Daniel Meczery's 3,000-strong force and captured 1,450 men of the Manfredini Infantry Regiment Nr. 12.

== Empire ==
=== Germany ===
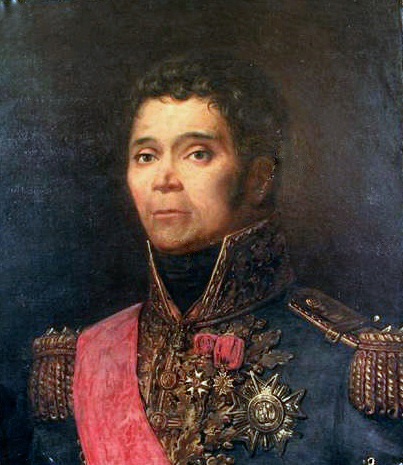
François Étienne de Kellermann

Schwarz was appointed an officer of the Légion d'Honneur on 15 June 1804. At the Battle of Austerlitz on 2 December 1805, the 5th Hussars served with the 5th Chasseurs à Cheval, and the 2nd and 4th Hussar Regiments in General of Division François Étienne de Kellermann's light cavalry division. Joseph Denis Picard and Frédéric Christophe Marisy led the two brigades. Kellermann's division fought on the northern flank of the battle in the struggle with Pyotr Bagration's 13,700 Russians and Prince Johann of Liechtenstein's 5,400 Austrian and Russian cavalry. Sometime after 9:30 AM, Emperor Napoleon ordered Marshal Jean Lannes to attack with his 14,200-man V Corps and Marshal Joachim Murat to support him with the 7,400-strong Cavalry Corps.

Lannes formed his infantry divisions with Marie-François Auguste de Caffarelli du Falga on the right and Louis Gabriel Suchet on the left. Kellermann's division advanced to the right front with Frédéric Henri Walther's 2nd Dragoon Division in support. When the ten-squadron Prince Constantine Uhlan Regiment attacked from the right, Kellermann ordered the division to change front. This maneuver failed and the French horsemen beat a rapid retreat behind Caffarelli's infantry. When the uhlans tried to pursue they were driven off by a volley that emptied many saddles and wounded the Russian brigadier. Kellerman pursued in echelon with his right-flank regiment leading. Anne-François-Charles Trelliard's cavalry brigade supported his left while Horace François Bastien Sébastiani's brigade of Walther's division followed behind. The Russians attacked Kellermann's lead regiment with three regiments, but they were overcome when Kellermann's other units came up on the left flank while Sébastiani's dragoons came up on the right.

Charging forward, Kellermann's troopers overran some Russian cannons but they had to fall back when three more cavalry regiments appeared. Kellermann countercharged with Sébastiani's two regiments covering the flanks and Walther's division in support. The attack drove back the enemy cavalry but the French horsemen were in turn driven back by musketry from the Russian infantry who recaptured the cannons. At this time Kellermann broke his leg and was succeeded in command by Picard. The Allied cavalry tried to exploit their success but Walther's dragoons stopped them cold. Having reformed his troopers Picard sent the 2nd Hussars in pursuit while the 5th Chasseurs recaptured the cannons. The 4th and 5th Hussars broke through the Russian infantry line and secured the temporary surrender of an infantry battalion, but the Tver Dragoon Regiment rescued their compatriots, inflicting serious losses. Reforming the division again, Picard ordered the 2nd Hussars and 5th Chasseurs to charge. The French horsemen broke through again, but Liechtenstein ordered up a mass of Austrian cavalry and the French retired.

At this point the French and Russian infantry closed with each other and casualties quickly mounted. Lannes repelled a counterattack and slowly pressed back Bagration's infantry. Liechtenstein hurled 40 squadrons against Caffarelli's division but three waves of cavalrymen were repulsed by French musketry. Murat sent in the two cuirassier divisions and the French prevailed, but only after terrible fighting. As Bagration abandoned the field he sent the remnants of his cavalry to cover the retreat. Kellermann's division was still closely involved, with the 4th Hussars helping to send off the Russian horsemen. For his role in the battle, Schwarz won the Commander's Cross of the Légion on 25 December 1805.

In the War of the Fourth Coalition, the 5th Hussars were assigned to Antoine Lasalle's light cavalry division and brigaded with the 7th Hussars. The hussar brigade helped rout a Prussian flank guard at Zehdenick on 26 October 1806 and fought at the Battle of Prenzlau on the 28th. On 30 October the Capitulation of Stettin occurred. With only 800 hussars, Lasalle bluffed Friedrich Romberg into surrendering the fortress and its garrison of 5,300 Prussians. The demand to surrender was carried by Schwarz, who addressed Romberg, "I’ve been sent by my superior, the Grand Duke of Berg, who summons you to surrender to him tomorrow morning. You will be granted the honors of war." Romberg refused, but Schwarz returned an hour later with an ultimatum announcing that a bombardment would precede an attack by 50,000 troops if Stettin was not surrendered by 8:00 AM. Furthermore, the garrison would not be granted quarter and the town would be sacked. At this, Romberg caved in. The 5th Hussars fought at the Battle of Golymin on 26 December 1806. Schwarz became a general of brigade on 30 December 1806 and a Baron of the Empire on 9 March 1808.

=== Spain ===
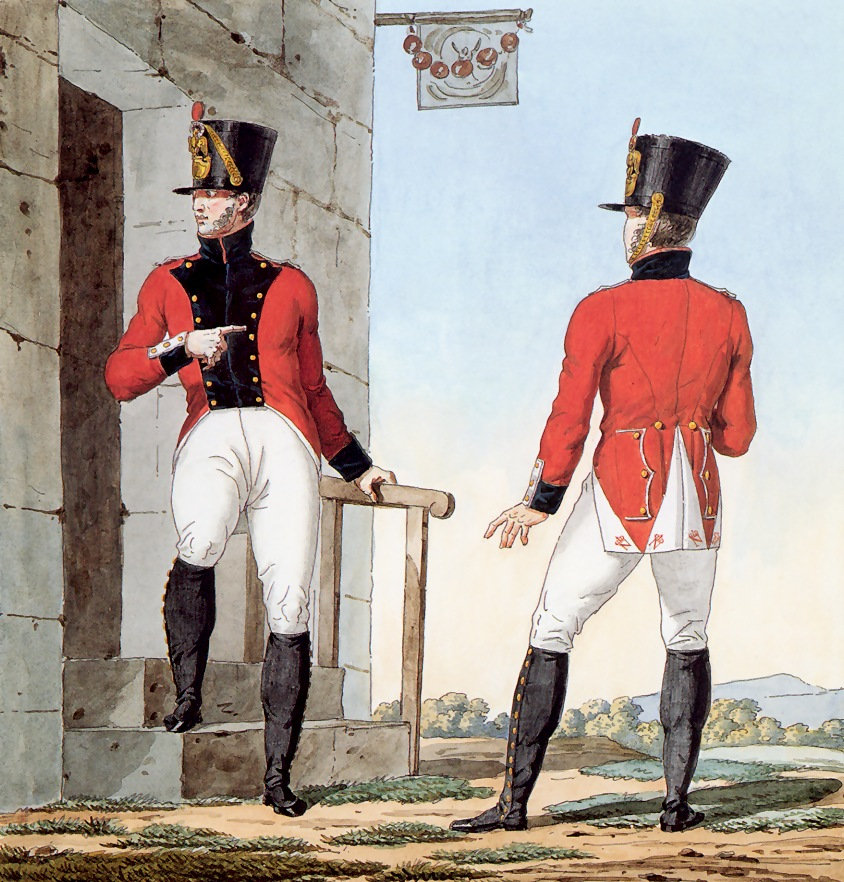
The 3rd Battalion of the 2nd Swiss Regiment formed part of Schwarz's force at Bruch Pass. The Swiss wore red coats.

In 1808 Schwarz was appointed to lead a cavalry brigade in the 12,714-man Corps of Observation of the Eastern Pyrenees under the overall command of Guillaume Philibert Duhesme. The brigade consisted of the Italian Prince Royal Chasseurs a Cheval, 504 sabers and the 2nd Neapolitan Chasseurs a Cheval, 388 sabers. On 29 February 1808, on the pretext of having a military review of his division, Giuseppe Lechi rushed his troops into the fortress of Barcelona and hustled the bewildered Spanish garrison out. By such treachery, Emperor Napoleon seized Barcelona and other Spanish cities and precipitated war with his former ally. After the Dos de Mayo Uprising, Emperor Napoleon ordered Duhesme to send 4,000 troops to seize Lerida and another 4,000 to march to Valencia to cooperate with Marshal Bon-Adrien Jeannot de Moncey's corps. These instructions grossly underestimated the strength of the Spanish revolt but Duhesme dutifully tried to carry them out. He assigned Schwarz a task force of 3,247 men to capture Lerida. This ad hoc brigade included the 3rd Battalion of the 2nd Swiss Regiment, 580 men, the 1st and 2nd Battalions of the 1st Neapolitan Regiment, 1,944 men, the 1st Battalion of the 1st Italian Velite Regiment, 519 men, one squadron of the 3rd Provisional Cuirassier Regiment, 204 sabers, and four artillery pieces. Duhesme sent Joseph Chabran with 3,195 men to Valencia. While Chabran's force included three French battalions and two French cavalry regiments, Schwarz had to march with a force of "doubtful value".

On 4 June 1808 Schwarz set out on his mission but was delayed for one day by a violent rainstorm. By the 6th he reached the Bruch Pass and found 300 to 400 miquelets of Manresa waiting for him in a pine forest. The Battle of the Bruch began when Schwarz sent forward a battalion and rather easily drove the Catalan militia out of the woods. The Manresans retreated until joined by more miquelets from nearby towns and villages. Schwarz sent out a line of skirmishers but did not press the attack, fearing that a larger force including Spanish regulars was nearby. In all probability, a full-scale attack would have routed the Catalans. However, as a cavalry officer, Schwarz was completely out of his element commanding infantry in rough terrain. He was also aware that Neapolitans were reputed to be the worst troops in Europe. Meanwhile, more miquelets arrived as reinforcements and threatened Schwarz's left flank. At this, he formed his soldiers into a large square with the guns and horsemen in the middle and began to retreat. The square was shielded by skirmishers, but as soon as they saw their enemies fall back, the Catalans eagerly pressed forward and began sniping at them. Coming upon the village of Esparraguera which its residents barricaded, Schwarz's square simply dissolved and flowed around the village. At this time one of his cannons fell off a bridge into a stream and was abandoned to the miquelets. On the other side of Esparraguera the officers were unable to reform the square and the Swiss, Italians, and Neapolitans poured into the town of Martorell that evening in a disorderly mob.

In February 1810, the VII Corps was reinforced by Marie François Rouyer's German Division. The troops arrived from France as an escort for a large supply convoy destined for Barcelona. Marshal Pierre Augereau, who taken command of VII Corps, ordered the divisions of Philippe Eustache Louis Severoli and his brother Jean Augereau to march on Tarragona. Meanwhile, one and a half battalions were dropped off at Vilafranca del Penedes while a brigade of Rouyer's division under Schwarz occupied Manresa as a flank guard. On 27 March 1810, the French demanded that Tarragona surrender, but Henry O'Donnell who commanded its 6,000-man garrison refused. Meanwhile, O'Donnell sent Juan Caro to attack the French lines of communication.

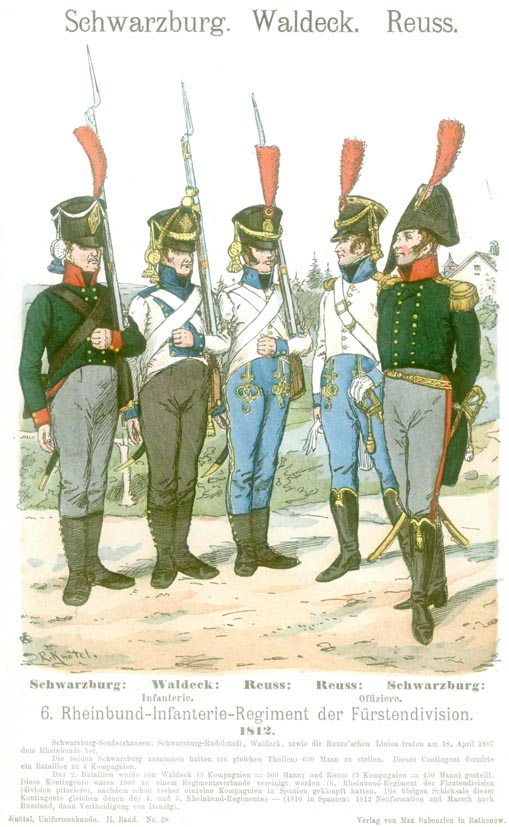
6th Confederation of the Rhine Regiment

The first blow fell at daybreak on 30 March when Caro seized Vilafranca and captured the 800 Imperial troops posted there. The Spanish force immediately moved against Manresa and began skirmishing with its defenders. These were two battalions each of the 3rd Confederation of the Rhine (1st Nassau) and the 4th Confederation of the Rhine (Ducal Saxon) Regiments. On 2 April, Caro was wounded and replaced by Luis González Torres de Navarra, Marquess of Campoverde. On 5 April in the Battle of Manresa, Campoverde mounted a full-scale attack and flushed Schwarz's troops out of the town with losses of 30 officers and 800 rank and file. However, a witness admitted 20 officers and 620 men were lost. As the defeated troops fled to Barcelona, they were set upon by the miquelets and suffered even more losses. Altogether, Schwarz may have lost two-thirds of his brigade. Historian Charles Oman called him the "ever-unlucky Schwartz". Digby Smith listed the 1st Nassau casualties as 42 killed, 203 wounded, 75 captured, and 164 missing for a total of 484. The Ducal Saxons lost 6 officers and 162 men killed, wounded, and missing. An additional 200 wounded soldiers were captured by the Spanish in the town. Caro and Campoverde had 3,000 miquelets under Colonel Roviera, 2,300 local militia, and 2,000 Spanish regulars including the Kayser Swiss Regiment and the Numancia Dragoon Regiment.

The last of Schwarz's misadventures came at the Battle of La Bisbal on 14 September 1810 when his brigade was snared by a well-executed Anglo-Spanish operation. After Augereau was superseded in command of VII Corps by Marshal Jacques MacDonald, the new commander moved 16,000 troops to the south to support Suchet's operations. MacDonald left Louis Baraguey d'Hilliers with almost 10,000 soldiers to hold Barcelona and 18,000 more to garrison other places and to hold open the road to France. O'Donnell realized that MacDonald was too strong to overcome so he decided to operate against the unsuspecting Imperial forces in the north. O'Donnell planned to take Campoverde's division north to attack Rouyer's division which was defending the area between Girona and the Mediterranean coast. Meanwhile, Charles William Doyle sailed north aboard the British frigate HMS Cambrian, the Spanish frigate Diana, and other vessels. Captain Francis William Fane of the Cambrian commanded the Allied naval squadron. O'Donnell managed to slip past the garrisons of Barcelona, Hostalric, and Girona.

The British naval expedition struck first on 10 September when they rowed ashore and captured 50 men and a coastal artillery emplacement at Begur. In response, Schwarz alerted his coastal units to harden their defenses. His understrength brigade included two battalions each of the 5th Confederation of the Rhine (Anhalt-Lippe) and 6th Confederation of the Rhine (Schwartzburg-Waldeck-Reuss) Regiments. The brigade counted 1,700 men and 18 artillery pieces. Schwarz deployed 800 men to hold La Bisbal d'Empordà and the rest of the brigade to defend Begur, Palamós, Calonge, and Sant Feliu de Guíxols. Still undetected, O'Donnell reached the village of Vidreres with 6,000-foot soldiers and 400 cavalrymen on 13 September 1810. The Spanish force included the Kayser Swiss Regiment, Numancia Dragoons, and miquelets.

The next morning, O'Donnell fell upon La Bisbal in overwhelming force. Schwarz had only time to send a courier with orders to his detachments to concentrate before being engulfed. The troops in La Bisbal withdrew to an old castle which was overlooked by a hill and a church tower. Schwarz held out until evening when he surrendered, after having lost five killed and 19 wounded. While the action in La Bispal was going on, the other outposts were being gobbled up. Fane and Doyle seized Palamós, Colonel Aldea captured Calonge, and Colonel Fleires overran Sant Feliu. Altogether, Schwarz, two colonels, 56 officers, 1,183 men, and 17 guns were captured. The Germans lost approximately 400 killed and wounded. Spanish losses were not reported but were probably light. However, they included O'Donnell who was badly wounded in the foot. He and the prisoners were taken off by Fane's squadron. Schwarz was held in captivity until the end of the war. He died on 9 October 1826.
