= Battle of Manresa (1810) =

1810 battle during the Peninsular War

Coordinates: 41°43′46″N 1°49′38″E

- Part of Peninsular War
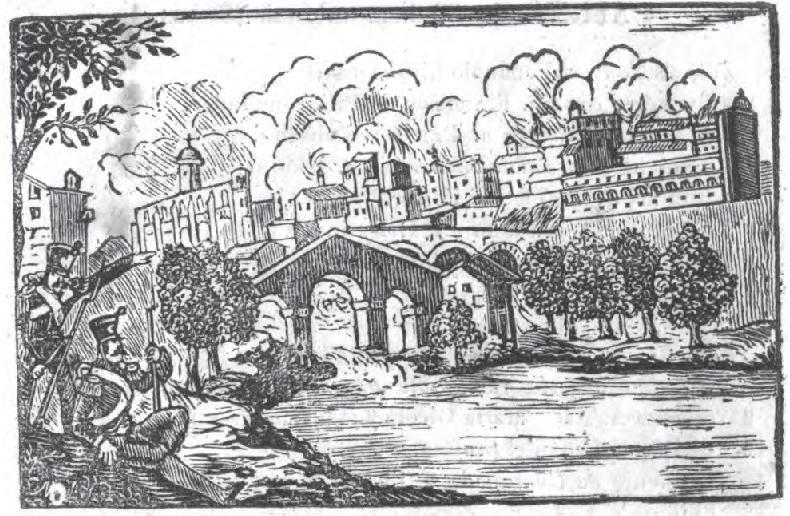
- Manresa was burned by the French on 30 March 1812.
Date	21 March – 5 April 1810
Location	Manresa, Catalonia, Spain; Vilafranca del Penedès, Spain
Result	Spanish victory

Belligerents
(France) First French Empire	Kingdom of Spain

Commanders and leaders
(France) Pierre Augereau (France) Marie François Rouyer (France) François de Schwarz	(Spain) Henry O'Donnell (Spain) Juan Caro (WIA) (Spain) Luis of Campoverde (Spain) Francesc Rovira

Units involved
(France) VII Corps	(Spain) Army of Catalonia

Strength
Vilafranca: 800; Manresa: 3,000	Vilafranca: 7,300; Manresa: 7,300

Casualties and losses
Vilafranca: 800; Manresa: 852	Vilafranca: light Manresa: light

Peninsular War: Aragón Catalonia

The Battle of Manresa and Battle of Vilafranca from 21 March to 5 April 1810 saw a Spanish division led by Juan Caro and Luis González Torres de Navarra, Marquess of Campoverde attack an Imperial French brigade commanded by François Xavier de Schwarz.

== Background ==
Caro's division first surprised the town of Vilafranca del Penedès in March and captured its 800-man garrison made up of troops from the Confederation of the Rhine. Vilafranca is located 35 kilometres (22 mi) west of Barcelona.

== Battle ==
The Spanish troops remained at large and fell upon the town of Manresa at the beginning of April. After several days of sparring they drove Schwarz and his German soldiers out of the town with heavy losses. Caro was wounded on 2 April and was replaced by Campoverde. The Spanish force included 2,000 regulars, 2,300 local miquelets (Catalan Militia), and Francesc Rovira i Sala's band of 3,000 miquelets. This minor disaster caused Marshal Pierre Augereau to call off Imperial troops which were threatening Tarragona. Schwarz's brigade belonged to Marie François Rouyer's division while Caro's division was part of Henry O'Donnell's Army of Catalonia. Manresa is located 40 kilometres (25 mi) northwest of Barcelona. The actions occurred during the Peninsular War, part of the Napoleonic Wars.
