= Pombo =

Pombo is a Galician surname. Notable people with the name include:

- Álvaro Pombo (born 1939), Spanish poet, novelist and activist
- Harry "Pombo" Villegas (1940–2019), Cuban revolutionary
- Richard Pombo (born 1961), American politician
- Rafael Pombo (1833–1912), Colombian poet
- Arsenio Linares y Pombo (1848–1914), Spanish military and government official
- Gabriel Pombo (born 1961), Uruguayan writer and lawyer, who is known for his books, essays and interviews relating to serial murderers
- Margarita Diez-Colunje y Pombo (1838–1919), Colombian historian, translator, genealogist

== See also ==
- Pombas
