= Battle of La Bisbal =

Battle of the Peninsular War

- Part of Peninsular War
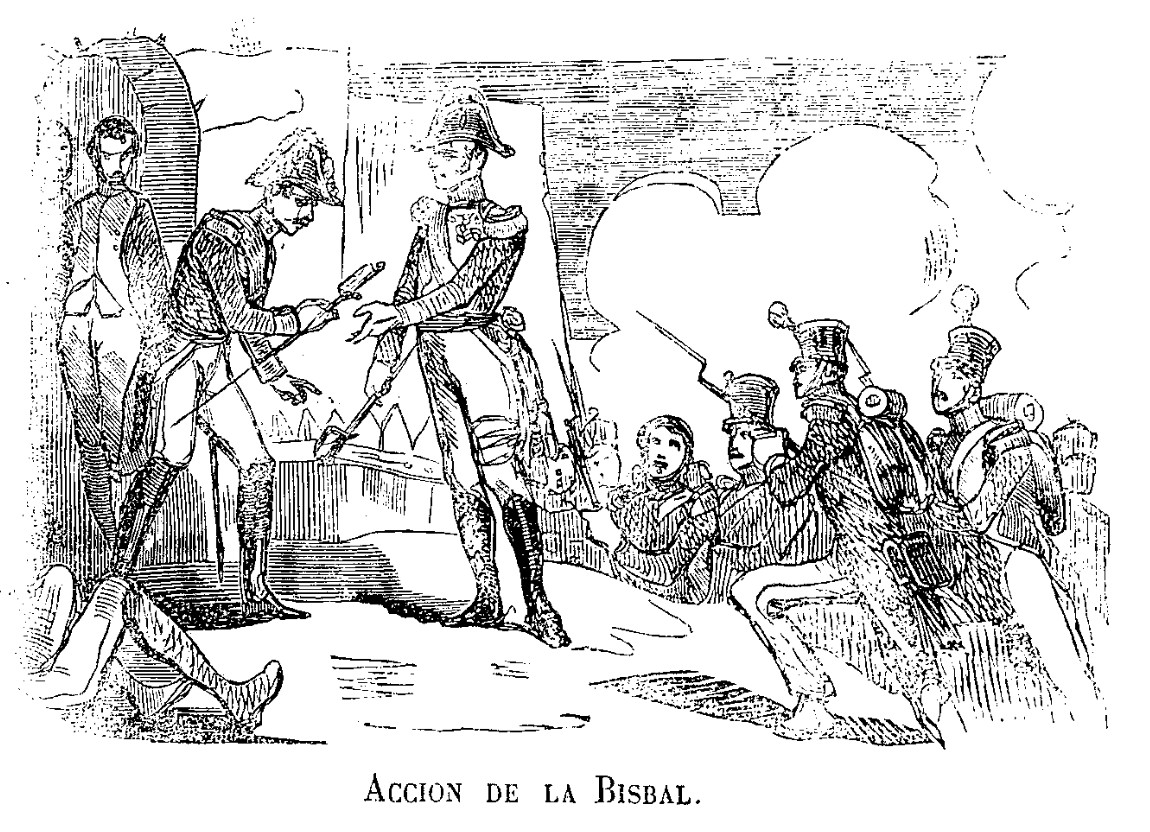
- Action of La Bisbal (1847 Spanish illustration)
Date	14 September 1810
Location	La Bisbal d'Empordà, Girona, Catalonia 41°57′36″N 3°02′26″E
Result	Anglo-Spanish victory

Belligerents
Spain; United Kingdom	France; Anhalt

Commanders and leaders
Enrique O'Donnell (WIA); Francis William Fane; Charles William Doyle	Marie François Rouyer; François Xavier de Schwarz (POW)

Units involved
Army of Catalonia; Royal Navy	VII Corps

Strength
6,600; 2 frigates	2,400

Casualties and losses
Unknown	400 killed or wounded 1,600 captured

Peninsular War: Aragón Catalonia
current battle

In the Battle of La Bisbal on 14 September 1810 a Spanish division led by Enrique O'Donnell and supported by an Anglo-Spanish naval squadron led by Francis William Fane and Charles William Doyle surprised an Imperial French brigade commanded by François Xavier de Schwarz. The Imperial troops were from the Confederation of the Rhine, a collection of small German states that were allied to Napoleon. Part of a division led by Marie François Rouyer, Schwarz's brigade was almost completely wiped out, most of its soldiers being taken prisoner along with its commander. One of the few Allied casualties was the capable O'Donnell, wounded in the foot. The battle occurred during the Peninsular War, part of the Napoleonic Wars.

The action occurred amid the events leading up to the Siege of Tortosa in December 1810 and January 1811. As Louis Gabriel Suchet prepared to attack Tortosa, Marshal Jacques MacDonald was ordered to support him. The marshal cooperated by advancing into southern Catalonia with a large force. To distract MacDonald from his mission, O'Donnell determined to raid northern Catalonia. The raid was a brilliant tactical success but it failed to deter the marshal from assisting Suchet. Finally, a logistical crisis forced MacDonald to withdraw to northern Catalonia.

== Background ==
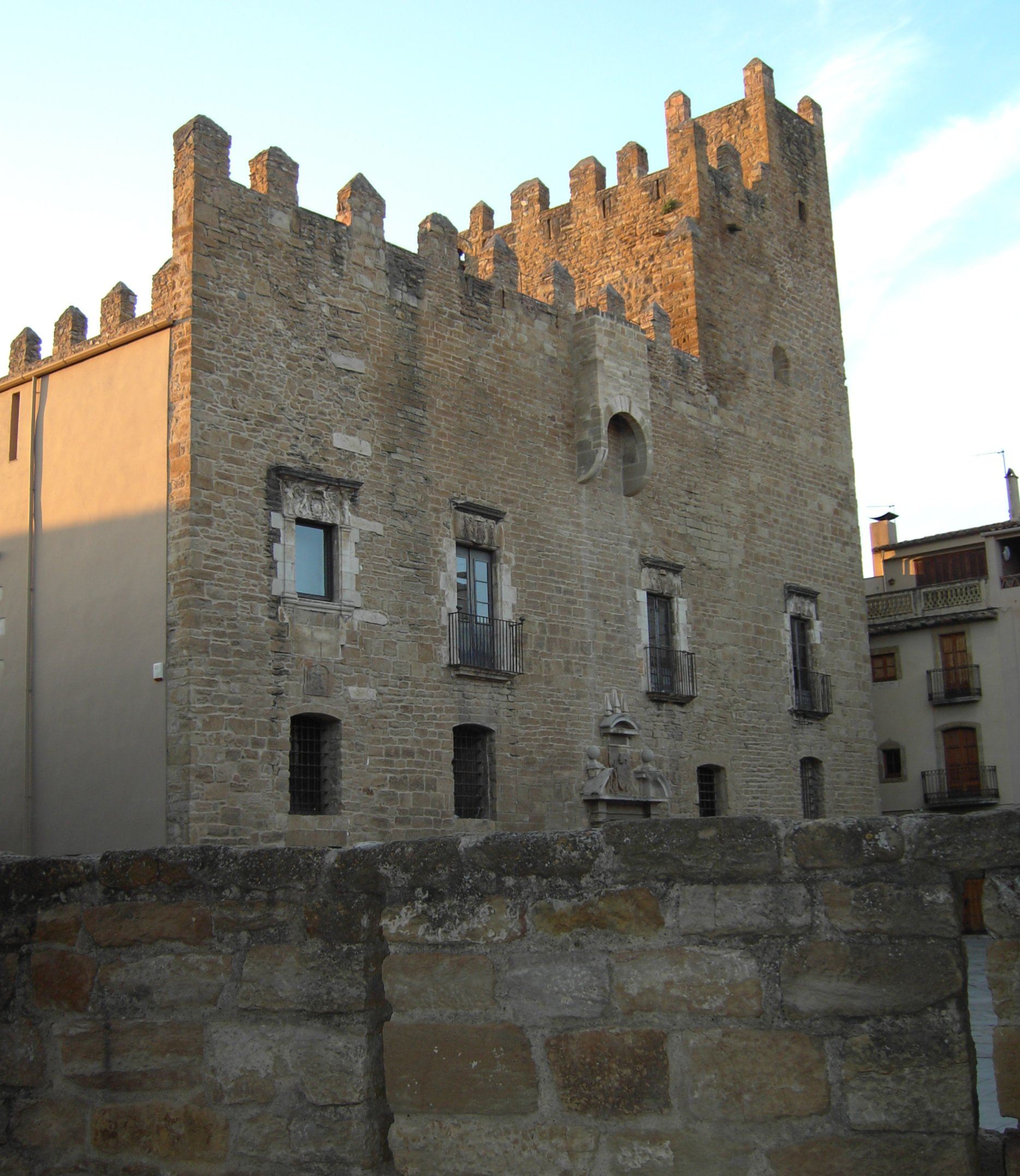
Bisbal Emporda castell

In June 1810, Marshal Pierre Augereau was replaced in command of VII Corps by Marshal Jacques MacDonald. Orders soon came from Paris. MacDonald was instructed to drive toward Tarragona while his colleague General of Division Louis Gabriel Suchet was to lead the III Corps to capture Tortosa. Suchet's corps had successfully concluded the Siege of Lerida on 13 May and the Siege of Mequinenza on 5 June.

Located on the Ebro River, Tortosa lay on the main highway between the provinces of Catalonia and Valencia. By seizing the city, Napoleon hoped to sever the link between the two areas. Before Suchet could implement the plan, he was compelled to return to Aragon to suppress the guerrillas. MacDonald also had difficulties. He first needed to restock his empty depots with supplies from France. It was August before either commander was ready to carry out their emperor's strategy.

MacDonald marched his field army of 16,000 troops south to support Suchet's operations against Tortosa. MacDonald left General of Division Louis Baraguey d'Hilliers with almost 10,000 soldiers to garrison Barcelona. In addition, there were 18,000 troops manning the defenses of other cities and holding open the road to France.

Captain General Enrique O'Donnell commanded the Spanish Army of Catalonia. Seeing that MacDonald was too strong to directly confront, O'Donnell resolved to operate against the unsuspecting Imperial forces in the north. By doing so, he hoped to draw MacDonald away from Tarragona and Tortosa. O'Donnell decided to leave the divisions of Generals Juan de Courten, Pedro Sarsfield, and Joaquín Ibáñez Cuevas y de Valonga, Baron de Eroles to hold Tarragona and take the division of General Luis González Torres de Navarra, Marquess of Campoverde north. He planned to avoid the large Barcelona garrison and attack General of Division Marie François Rouyer's German division which was holding the area between Girona and Palamós on the Mediterranean coast. Meanwhile, Colonel Charles William Doyle sailed north with 500 foot soldiers aboard the British frigate HMS Cambrian, the Spanish frigate Diana, and other vessels. Captain Francis William Fane of the Cambrian commanded the Allied naval squadron. In early September, O'Donnell managed to elude the garrisons of Barcelona, Hostalric, and Girona without being noticed.

== Battle ==
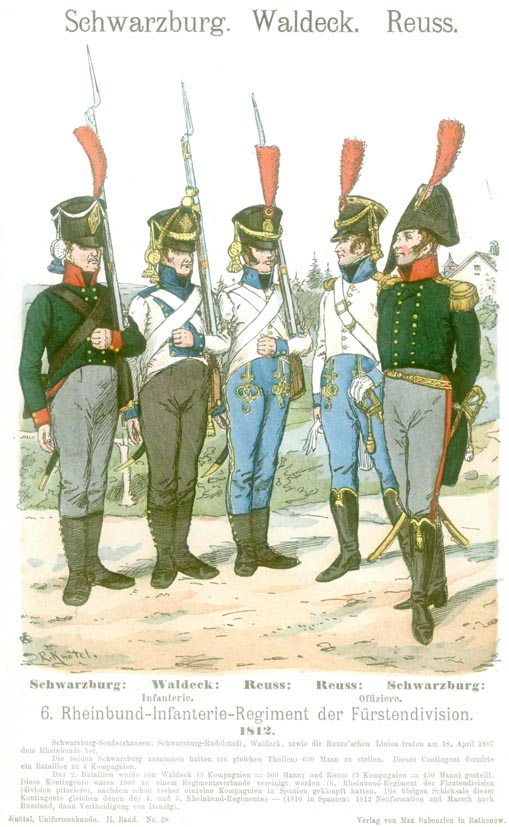
6th Confederation of the Rhine Regiment

Fane's Anglo-Spanish naval expedition struck first on 10 September. An amphibious force rowed ashore at Begur and captured 50 men and a coastal artillery emplacement. Alerted by this raid, General of Brigade François Xavier de Schwarz ordered his coastal units to beef up their defenses. His brigade comprised two battalions each of the 5th Confederation of the Rhine (Anhalt-Lippe) and 6th Confederation of the Rhine (Schwarzburg-Waldeck-Reuss) Regiments. The brigade numbered 1,700 men with 18 artillery pieces. Schwarz posted 800 men and his headquarters at La Bisbal d'Empordà while the remainder of the brigade was spread out to defend Begur, Calonge, Palamós, and Sant Feliu de Guíxols. Still undetected, O'Donnell arrived at the village of Vidreres with 6,000 foot soldiers and 400 cavalrymen on 13 September 1810. Another authority counted 6,600 men in the Spanish force, including the Kayser Swiss Regiment, Numancia Dragoons, and miquelets.

On the morning of the 14th, O'Donnell attacked La Bisbal in overwhelming force. As his pickets were driven in, Schwarz sent a courier with orders to his detachments to concentrate. Shortly afterward, La Bisbal was surrounded and its defenders fell back to an old castle. Unfortunately, the structure was dominated by a nearby hill and a church tower from which snipers picked off a few Germans during the day. Schwarz held out until evening; he surrendered after the Spanish began massing for an assault. The French commander did not put up much of a battle, losing only one officer and four men killed, and three officers and 16 rank and file wounded.

While the action in La Bisbal was going on, Schwarz's other outposts were being snapped up. Fane and Doyle landed their troops at Palamós and captured it. Colonel Aldea's column overran Calonge while Colonel Fleires's column seized Sant Feliu. Rouyer at Girona was unable to intervene because O'Donnell called out the local miquelets to harass his garrison. Schwarz, two colonels, 56 officers, 1,183 men, and 17 guns were captured for a total of 1,242 prisoners. The Germans also lost approximately 400 killed and wounded. Spanish losses were not reported but were probably light. However, they included O'Donnell who was badly wounded in the foot at La Bisbal. The Spanish general and the German prisoners were taken aboard Fane's squadron before it sailed back to Tarragona.

Schwarz was held in captivity until the end of the war in 1814. A number of German prisoners were transported to Edinburgh, with the officers being paroled to various towns in the Scottish Borders, including some who joined the Masonic lodge in Hawick. O'Donnell's wound became infected and he nearly died before being sent to Majorca to recover. Until his injury healed, the high command in Catalonia passed into the less capable hands of Lieutenant General Miguel Iranzo. O'Donnell later received the title 1st Count of la Bisbal in recognition of his victory.

== Aftermath ==
Campoverde took command of the land force and headed north past Girona before Rouyer or Baraguey d'Hilliers could react. He captured Puigcerdà in the Cerdanya and crossed the Pyrenees into France. His troops clashed with the garrison of Mont-Louis and extorted funds from French villages. Recrossing the border, Campoverde's division moved down the Segre River valley and took position at Calaf and Cardona.

Because he was so isolated from northern Catalonia by the guerillas, MacDonald did not hear of the La Bisbal disaster until three weeks later. Nevertheless, he initially maintained his position in support of Suchet. By holding his ground MacDonald nullified O'Donnell's strategy. Other events would finally distract the marshal from his position in the south.

When Campoverde moved south to Cardona, the marshal took two French and two Italian brigades to attack him. An Italian brigade attacked at once on 18 October and took a beating. MacDonald declined to press his enemies further because provisions in Barcelona were getting low. Instead he lumbered off to Girona so he could protect his supply convoys. Suchet was not able to begin the Siege of Tortosa until 16 December 1810.
