= La Bisbal d'Empordà =

La Bisbal d'Empordà Fontanet La Bisbal del Ampurdán
- Municipality
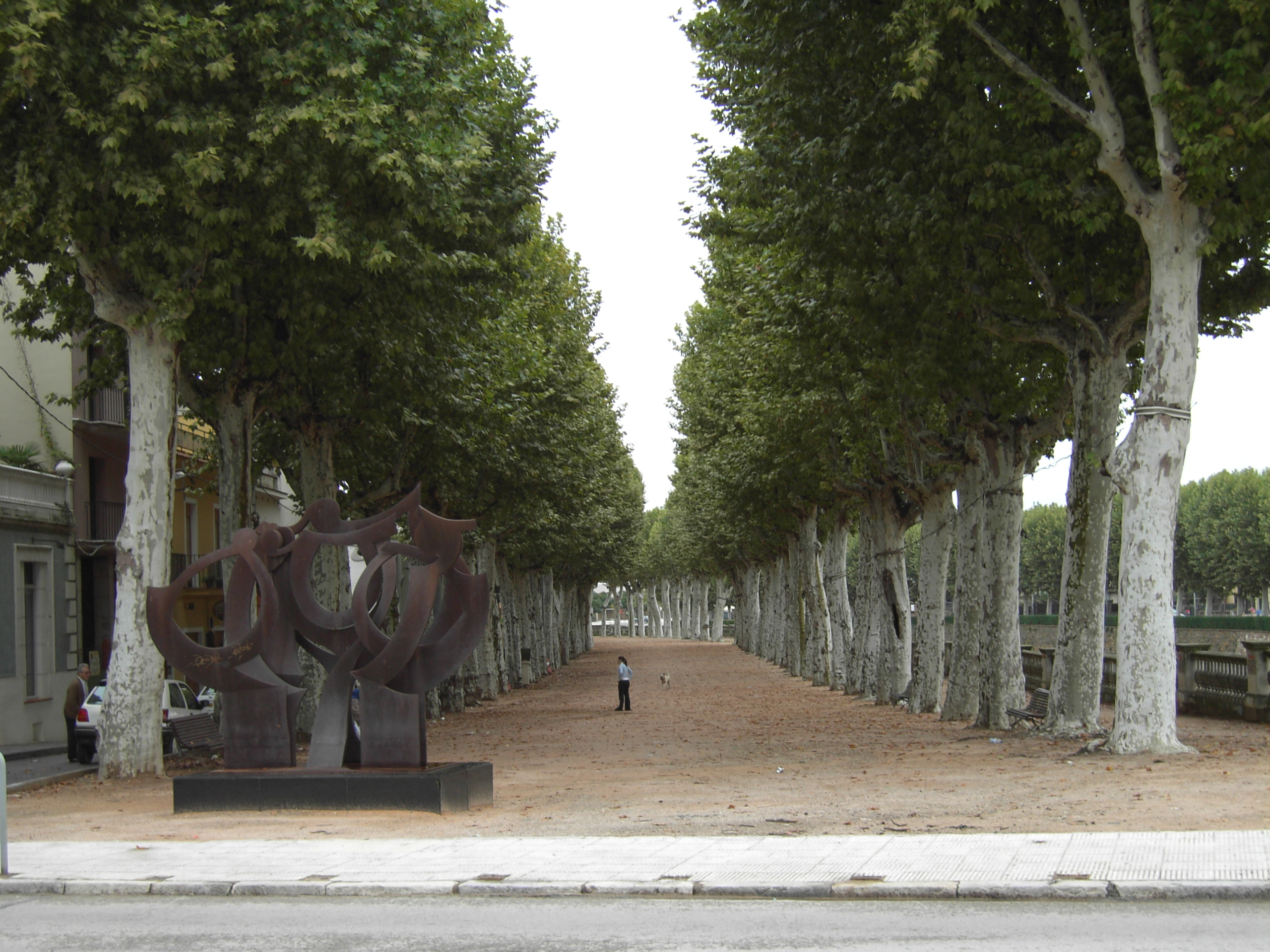

- Flag Coat of arms

- Location in Catalonia La Bisbal d'Empordà (Spain)
- Coordinates: 41°57′36″N 3°02′26″E
- Country: Spain
- Community: Catalonia
- Province: Girona
- Comarca: Baix Empordà

Government
  - Mayor: Oscar Aparicio Pedrosa (2023) (PSC)

Area
  - Total: 20.6 km^{2} (8.0 sq mi)
- Elevation: 39 m (128 ft)

Population (2025-01-01)
  - Total: 11,757
  - Density: 571/km^{2} (1,480/sq mi)
- Climate: Csa
- Website: labisbal.cat

La Bisbal d'Empordà (Catalan pronunciation: [lə βizˈbal dəmpuɾˈða]) is the county seat of the comarca of Baix Empordà in Girona, Catalonia, Spain. It is located on the Empordà plain, adjacent to the Gavarres and watered by the river Daró.

La Bisbal is known for its ceramics. In addition, it is the ceramics capital of Catalonia

The town lies 29 km southeast of Girona, 12 km west of Palafrugell and 19 km northwest of Palamós along road C-66 from Girona to Palafrugell/Palamós, where it becomes C-31. Two other roads branch off at La Bisbal, GI-660 to Calonge and Sant Feliu de Guíxols and GI-664 to Cassà de la Selva; both roads cross the hilly coastal range called the Gavarres, with many twists and turns. The municipality lies on the northern edge of the Gavarres, on either side of the Daró river-bed, a dry tributary of River Ter.

The town's name is derived from the Catalan word for "bishop", 'bisbe', as the town was owned by the bishops of Girona from the Carolingian period onward. The town is built over the site of a Roman settlement named Fontanetum, and in Old Catalan was sometimes referred to as Fontanet.

The modern settlement can be dated back to no later than the consecration of the church of Santa Maria de la Bisbal in 901 (the current baroque structure dates from the 17th century). The fortified episcopal palace, constructed partially in the Romanesque style, occupies an eminent spot in the historic town center.

The town became home to many French immigrants after the French Revolution of 1789 and saw several skirmishes during the Napoleonic Wars (Peninsular War). In the Battle of La Bisbal, Spanish General Henry O'Donnell defeated the French forces of General François Xavier de Schwarz on 14 September 1810. The town was briefly occupied by Carlist forces in 1874 during the Third Carlist War.

The town was served by the 750 mm (2 ft 5 1/2 in) gauge Palamós–Girona–Banyoles railway, which reached a junction with the Barcelona–Cerbère railway at Flaçà by 1887 and was extended to Girona by 1921. Service on the line continued until 1956.

== Economy ==
The economy is heavily based on pottery manufacture, as well as agriculture.

== Culture ==
La Bisbal d'Empordà is one of the traditional centers of the Sardana, the Catalan folk dance.

The town festival (in catalan: Festa Major) of La Bisbal takes place on 14, 15, 16, 17 and 18 August. The town festival is in honour of the patron saint of the municipality, Maria.

Over the five days of the town festival, around eighty events organised by the town's associations and organisations can be enjoyed. These include the Correfoc, the Giants' dance, the Promenade, the Historical Follow-up (in catalan: seguici històric), the Dance of the Àliga or the proclamation (in catalan: pregó).

The Trencament del Càntir (Breaking of the pitcher) is the solemn act that kicks off the festa. The pitcher is broken by a prominent local figure, who is also different each year. The event features a popular song created especially for the occasion, El rock del càntir.

== Geography ==
Besides the town of La Bisbal d'Empordà itself, the municipality includes the following populated places:

- Aigüeta
- Castell d'Empordà
- Sant Pol de la Bisbal

== Gastronomy ==
La Bisbal is known for the sweets of its pastry shops:

- Bisbalenc – Pastry Sans
- Rus – Pastry Massot
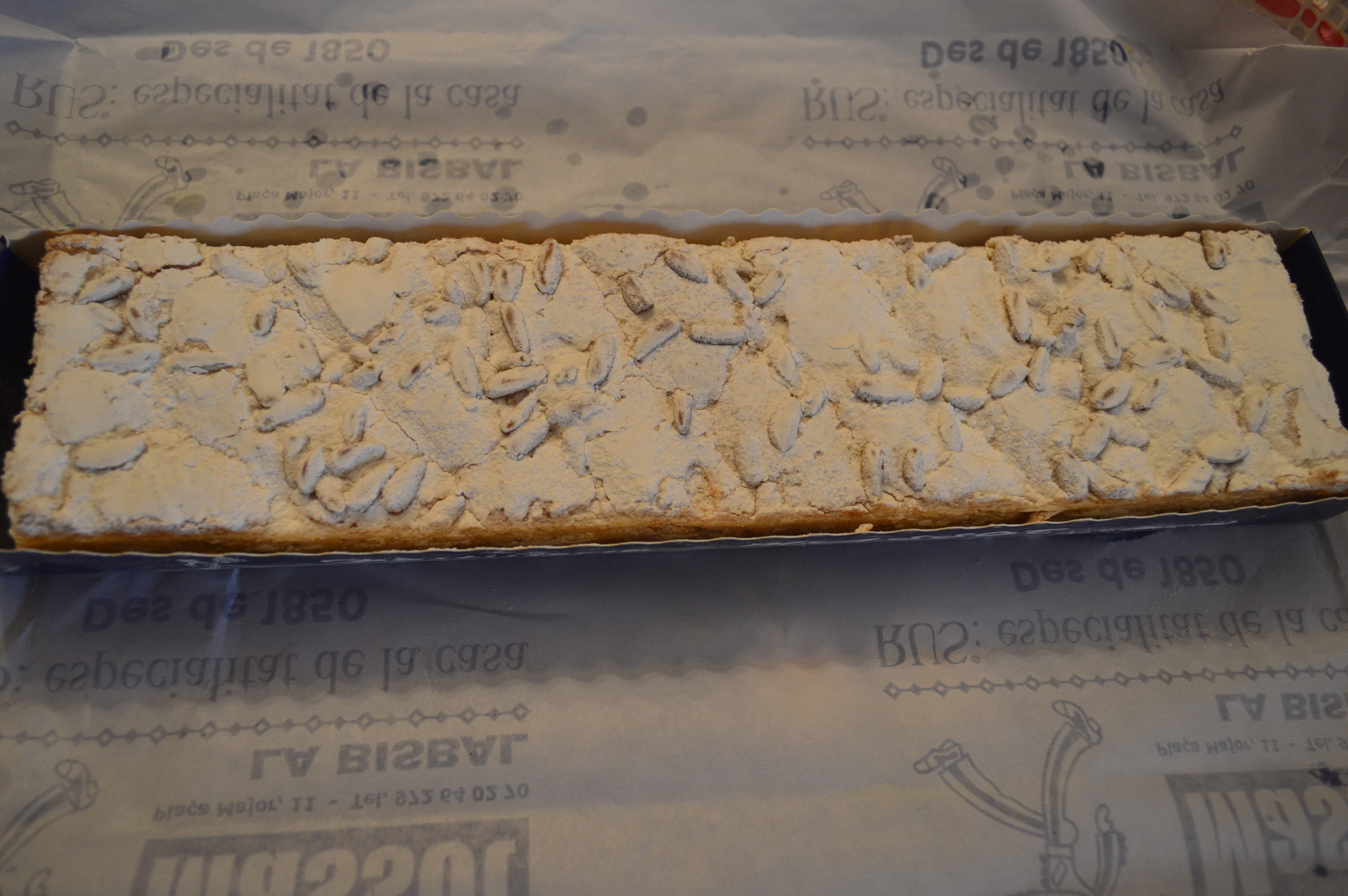
  Rus of Pastry Massot
- Càntir – Pastry Font
- Mil·lenni – Pastry Font
- Biscuits Graupera

== Notable people ==
- Albert Solà (1956–2022), self-claimed illegitimate son of King Juan Carlos I

== Gallery ==
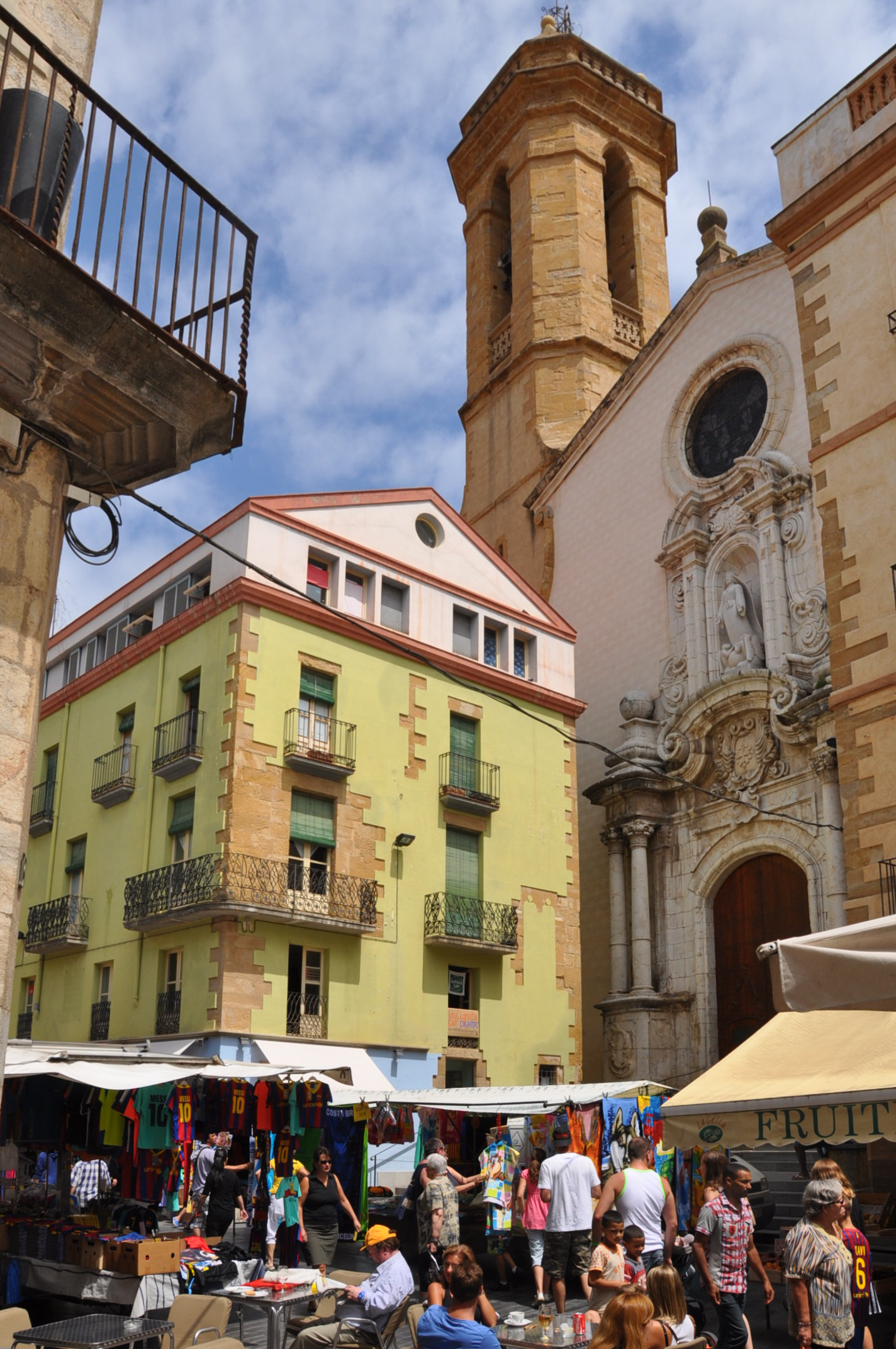
Weekly market on Plaça Major, with the Santa Maria church.

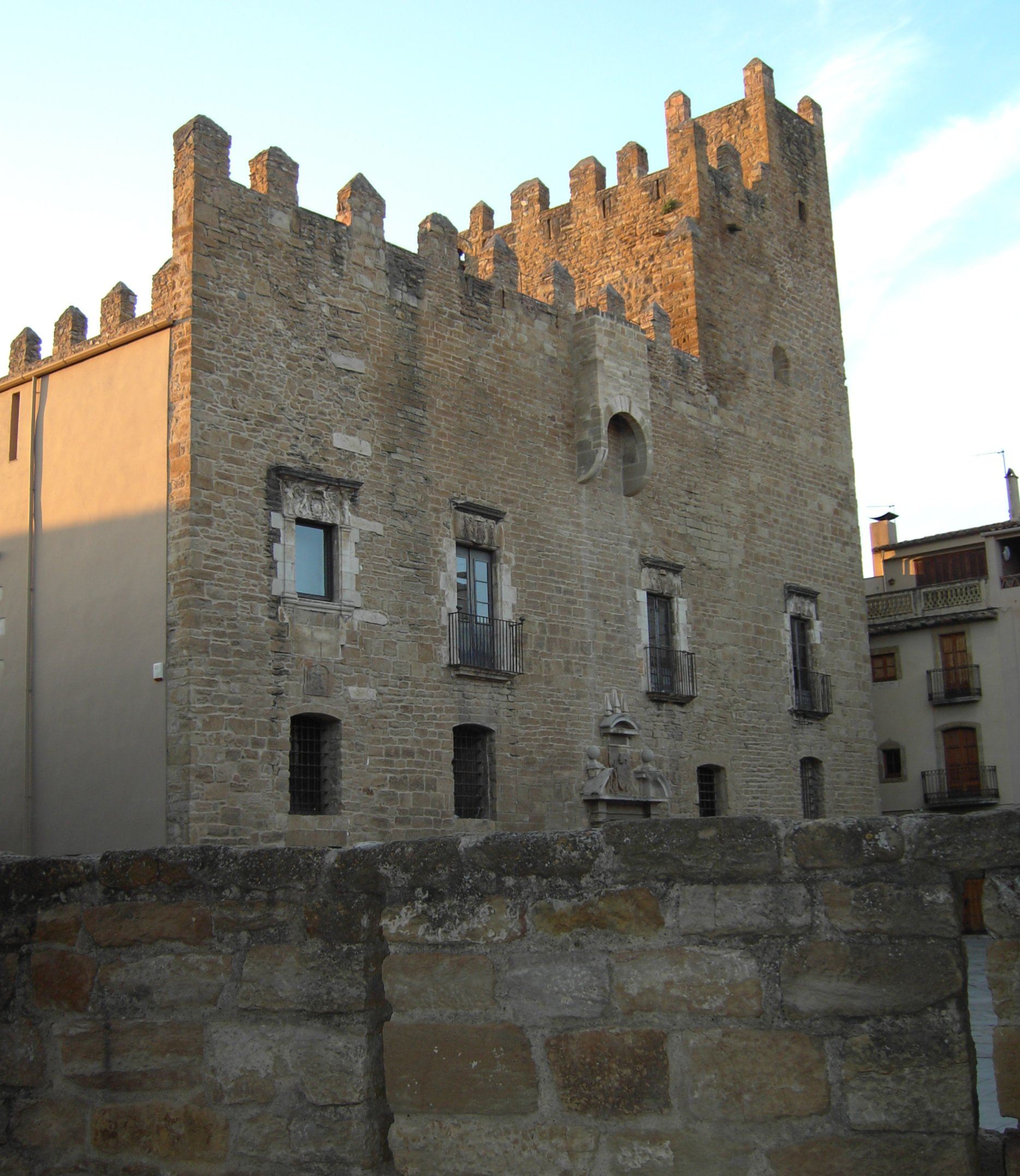
The palace-castle of La Bisbal.

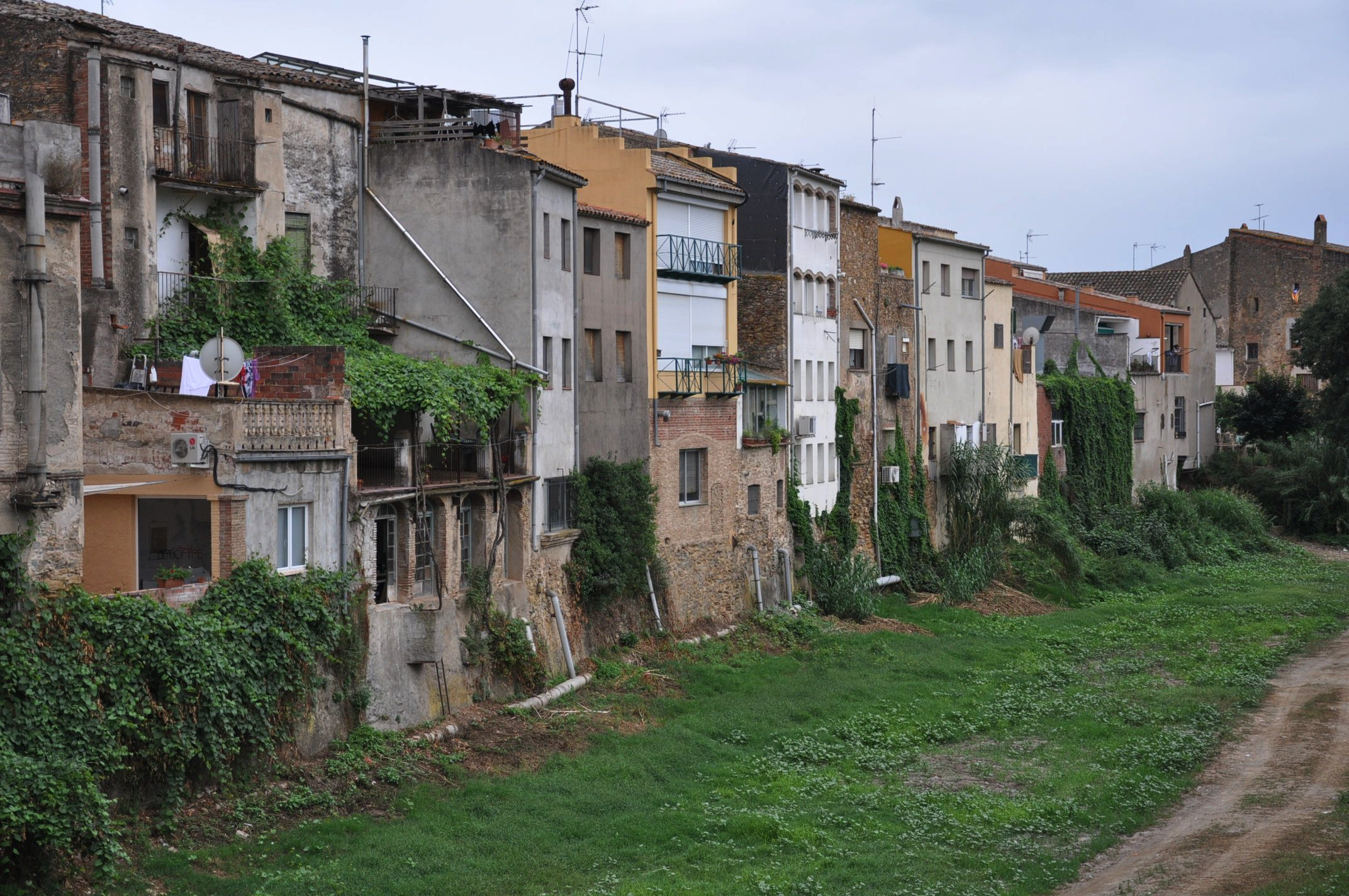
The dry bed of the river Daró in the town centre.

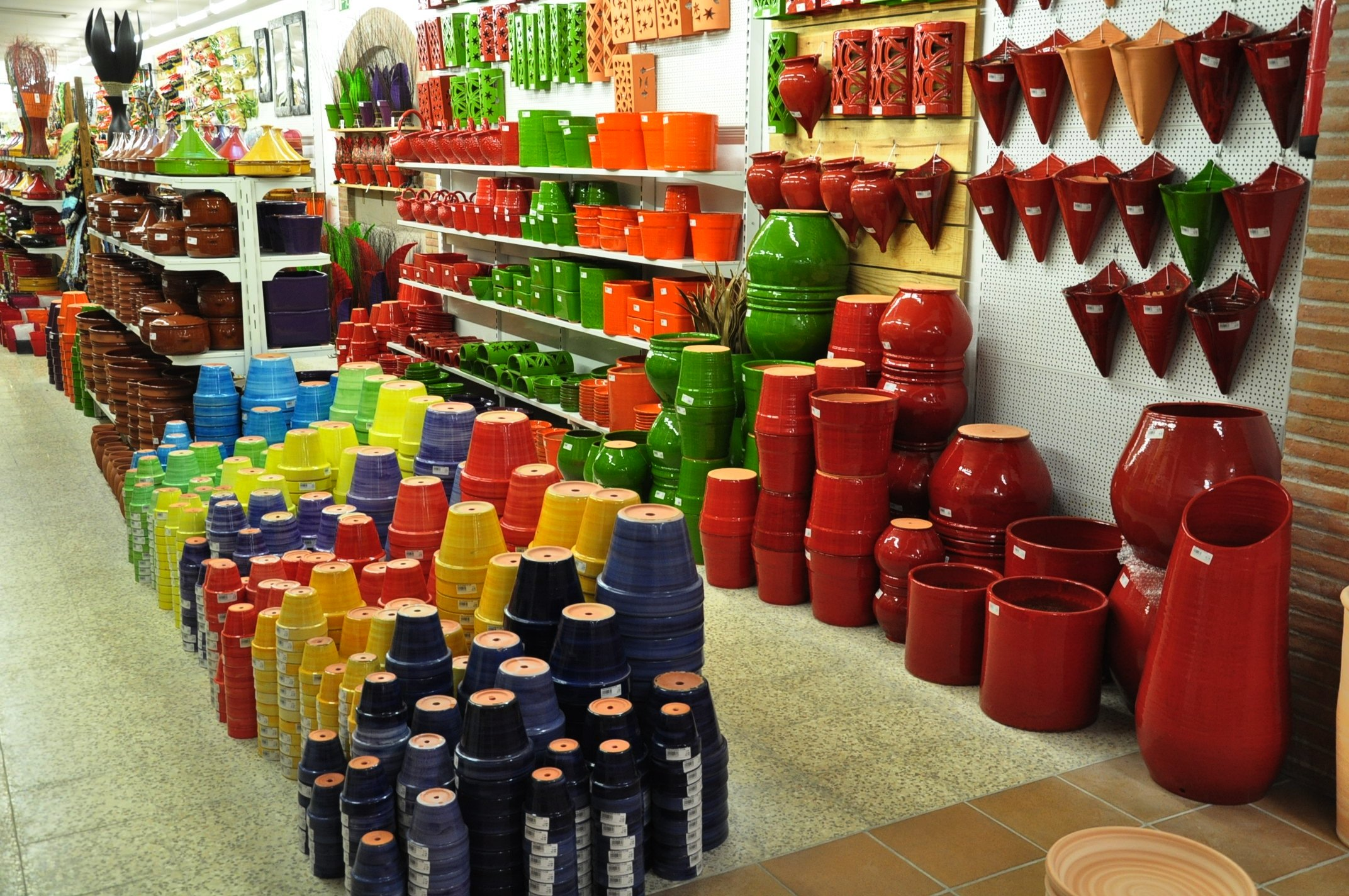
Ceramics is the mainstay of the local economy.
