= Enrique O'Donnell, Conde de La Bisbal =

Spanish general of Irish descent (1769–1834)

Enrique José O'Donnell
- Born: 1769; San Sebastián, Spain
- Died: 17 May 1834 (aged 64–65); Montpellier, France
- Relatives: Margarita Diez-Colunje y Pombo
- Military career
- Allegiance: Kingdom of Spain
- Branch: Infantry
- Rank: Captain General
- Conflicts: Peninsular War; Battle of Vich; Battle of Margalef; Battle of La Bisbal
- Awards: Conde de La Bisbal

Enrique José O'Donnell y Anatar, conde de La Bisbal or (English: Henry Joseph O'Donnell) (1769 – 17 May 1834) was a Spanish general of Irish descent who fought in the Peninsular War.

== Biography ==
O'Donnell was born in San Sebastián, a descendant of the Irish noble dynasty of O'Donnell of Tyrconnell who left Ireland after the Battle of the Boyne, A member of the branch of the family that settled in Austria, General Karl O'Donnell Count of Tyrconnell (1715–1771), held important commands during the Seven Years' War. His father was Joseph O'Donnell y O'Donnell (1722–1787), Colonel of the Spanish Infantry Regiment of Ireland, Lieutenant General of the Spanish Army, and his mother was Mariana de Anethan y Mareshal, of Luxemburg.

Born in Spain, he early entered the Spanish army, fighting in 1793–1795 in the Convention War, and in 1810 became general, receiving a command in Catalonia, where in that year he earned his title and the rank of field-marshal. While fighting against General Gouvion-Saint-Cyr, (1764–1830), he managed to enter the besieged Girona and move troops to Vic. At the Battle of La Bisbal he defeated General Schwartz, earning thus the title of Count of La Bisbal although he was wounded in a leg.

In 1811 he was appointed Captain General of Valencia and from 22 January 1812 to 7 March 1813 he was one of the members of the III Council of Regency, taking part as a sort of shady patron in the revolt in Catalonia led by Captain General Luis Roberto de Lacy (San Roque, executed by firing squad at the Castle of Bellver, Palma de Mallorca, in 1817), and who was also descended from Irish-Spanish military people, and had tried to set up a Republic.

He afterwards held posts of great responsibility under Ferdinand VII. During the Liberal Triennium he supported the liberals despite his absolutist convictions, because he was against French intervention.

The events of 1823 compelled his flight into France to Limoges where he was interned. When King Ferdinand VII of Spain died in 1834, O'Donnell died in Montpellier on the way back to Spain.

== Family ==
O'Donnell was the brother of Carlos O'Donnell y Mareschal, the father of general and politician Leopoldo O'Donnell y Jorris (invested as Duke of Tetuan and Count of Lucena), and father of Lieutenant General of the Spanish Army Enrique O'Donnell y Jorris.
