= Gabriel Pombo =

Uruguayan writer and lawyer (born 1961)

- Born: Gabriel Antonio Pombo Berga; 11 October 1961 (age 64); Montevideo, Uruguay
- Education: University of the Republic
- Occupations: Writer, lawyer
- Writing career
- Language: Spanish
- Website: pomboypombo.blogspot.com

Signature
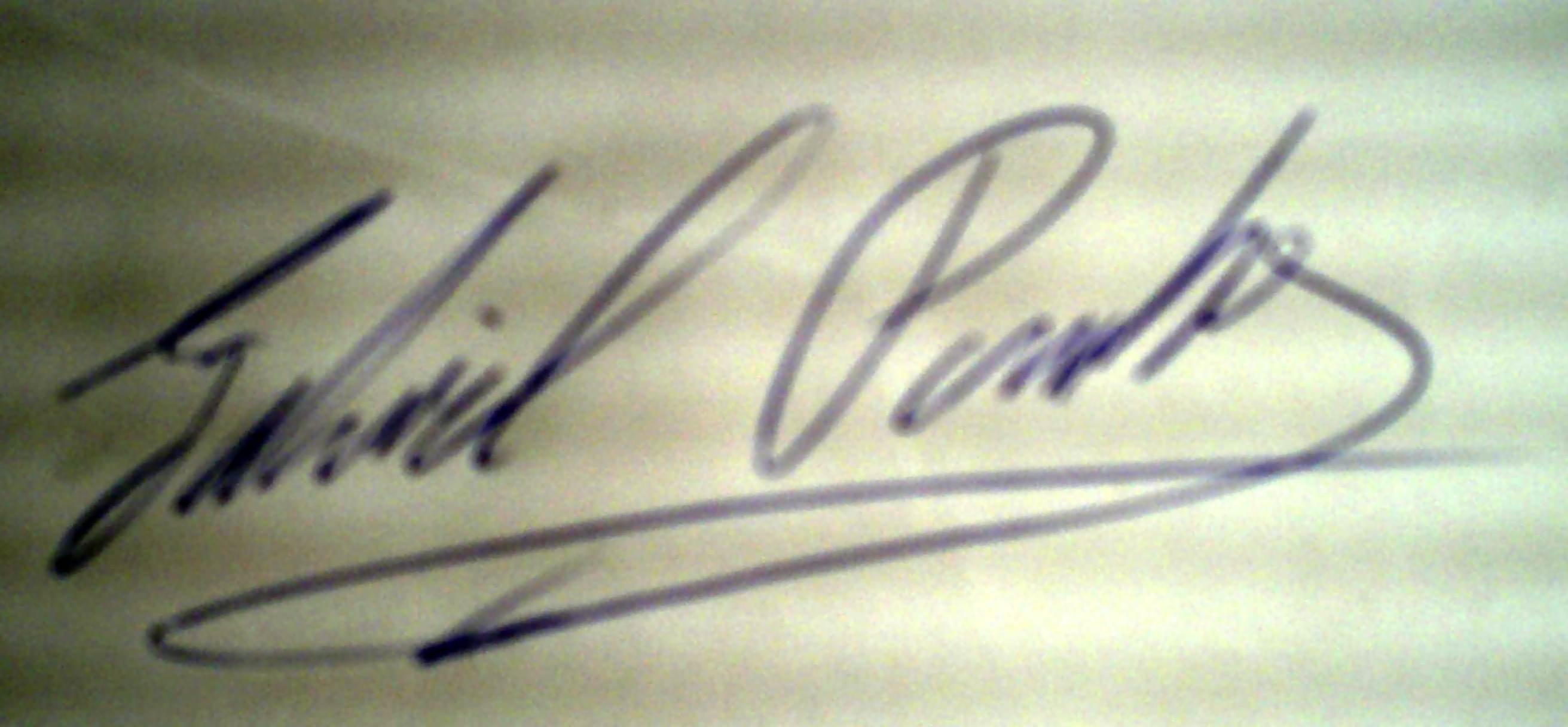

Gabriel Antonio Pombo (born 11 October 1961 in Montevideo) is a Uruguayan writer and lawyer, who is known for his books, essays and interviews relating to serial murderers, and particularly about the famous case of Jack the Ripper, the mysterious and never discovered murderer of London. Gabriel Pombo even wrote a humorous short story fiction, which tells how, during a foggy night a very confused Jack the Ripper mistakenly entered the offices of Scotland Yard believing that was a tavern.

== Profile ==
He graduated from the Faculty of Law and Social Sciences of the University of Uruguay (Montevideo) in 1988, and thereafter exercised their profession independently.

Since 2006, he participated as an exhibitor of legal, historical, political and criminological issues, in several radio programs of Uruguay, and particularly during 2007 hearing was a panelist at "The Bridge" in CX 4 Rural Radio.

In early 2008 he published his first book, to which he gave the title "The Monster of London: The Legend of Jack the Ripper" From mid to late 2008, gave a series of talks about Jack the Ripper and the Victorian era, in the Uruguayan cultural center El Ateneo.

He was also a columnist for the Uruguayan monthly cultural magazine called "DIMENSIÓN DESCONOCIDA" ("UNKNOWN DIMENSION"), from late 2008 to December 2009. Pombo's contact with the magazine, basically initiated following a report that was made on the occasion of his first book, in the November 2008 edition. That issue was devoted almost entirely to the case of Jack the Ripper. Thereafter invited to participate, he joined the staff of the publication, going to take over the "police report" to which drafted reports on famous criminology and criminal cases. Sometimes produced feature articles that occupied most of the respective sample, for instance, the June 2009 work entitled "Serial Murderers: Scourge of Humanity”.

Such contributions were reproduced in various cultural publications, printed on paper or as digital. This work eventually became the basis for the creation of his book "Stories of Murderers", at the phenomenon of serial crime and adventures of the dark characters who have acted in this framework.

In 2010, expanded approaches to the Whitechapel murderer case with the book "Jack the Ripper: The Legend Continues".

And since early 2012 and in the cultural program "Agenda Abierta" ("Open Agenda"), he takes care of the column of criminology and criminal policy, issued regularly on Impartial CX28 Radio AM 1090 in Montevideo, Uruguay, also developing the theme crime fiction in the same station, in a program entitled "La Tarde es nuestra" ("the afternoon is ours").

Now to close this detail and effects to mention one more recent activity data, the researcher Gabriel Pombo participated Monday 4 February 2013 in an interview with Spanish radio Dreams Live: Your dreams radio, directed by Sasha and presenter Martin Hernandez degree on the subject of Jack the Ripper.

== Books ==
- (in Spanish) El Monstruo de Londres: La Leyenda de Jack el Destripador, Artemisa Editores, Montevideo, 2008, ISBN 978-9974-8051-7-0.
- (in Spanish) Asesinos seriales: Flagelo de la Humanidad, Montevideo, 2009.
- (in Spanish) Historias de asesinos, Montevideo, 2010, ISBN 978-9974-611-38-2.
- (in Spanish) Jack el Destripador: La leyenda continúa, Montevideo, 2010, ISBN 9789974106635.
- (in Spanish) La verdadera historia de Jack el Destripador, Montevideo, 2013.

=== Titles translated to English ===
- The London Monster: The Legend of Jack the Ripper, Artemisa Publishers, Montevideo, 2008, ISBN 978-9974-8051-7-0.
- Serial Murderers: Scourge of Humanity, Montevideo, 2009.
- Stories of murderers, Montevideo, 2010, ISBN 978-9974-611-38-2.
- Jack the Ripper: The Legend Continues, Montevideo, 2010, ISBN 9789974106635.
- The true story of Jack the Ripper, Montevideo, 2013.

== See also ==
- Jack the Ripper

== Notes and citations ==
=== Notes and citations translated to English ===
1. Interviewing Gabriel Pombo: "Jack is the most enigmatic criminal case and exciting that records the global criminology", in digital web site 'Crimen-y-Criminólogo.com', 24 July 2012.
2. Domestic violence: before and after the triple homicide, “Esta boca es mía” (“This Mouth is Mine” T.V. Program Teledoce, Uruguay), 10 August 2012.
3. Gabriel Pombo talking about the case of Paul Goncalves, “Buen Día Uruguay” (Good Morning Uruguay”, T.V. program Morning Program), MontecarloTV-Channel 4, Uruguay), 12 June 2012 (Paul Goncalves was convicted of three murders, although at trial the accused pleaded innocent).
4. Triple homicide in the Pinar (Uruguay), in digital web site 'Crimen y Criminólogo' (Crime and Criminologist), 20 August 2012.
5. "The true story of Jack the Ripper", 28 August 2012.
6. Henciclopedia, "Gabriel Antonio Pombo Profile" (in Spanish).
7. Dr. Eduardo Zinna. Commentary on the book "The London Monster" by Gabriel Pombo" (in English). "Ripperologist Magazine n° 97, November 2008, pp. 109–111.
8. Book The Monster of London: The Legend of Jack the Ripper in Google books, Montevideo, 2008, ISBN 978-9974-8051-7-0
9. Serial Murderers: Scourge of the humanity Internet in digital platform SlideShare
10. "Uruguayan Henciclopedia digital publication" Serial Murderers: a scourge of our contemporary society – Murderers Stories: Burke and Hare – Jack the Ripper, the monster of London – Jack the Ripper: the first modern serial murderer – Murderers Stories: the French Bluebeard – Murderers Stories: Paul Goncalves – Paul Goncalves and Carrasco crimes.
11. Murderers Stories in Google books, Montevideo, 2010, ISBN 978-9974-611-38-2.
12. Gabriel Pombo: "Stories of murderers" website 'Crimen y Criminología', 24 October 2012.
13. Jack the Ripper: The Legend Continues in Google books.
14. Dreams Live: Your dreams radio Speaker in Dreams Live website.
15. Interview with Gabriel Pombo on Spanish radio "Live Dreams: Your Dreams Radio", directed by Sasha and presenter Martin Hernandez graduated about Jack the Ripper.
16. The true story of Jack the Ripper, digital site SlideShare, 16 January 2013.
