= Margarita Diez-Colunje y Pombo =

Colombian historian, translator and genealogist

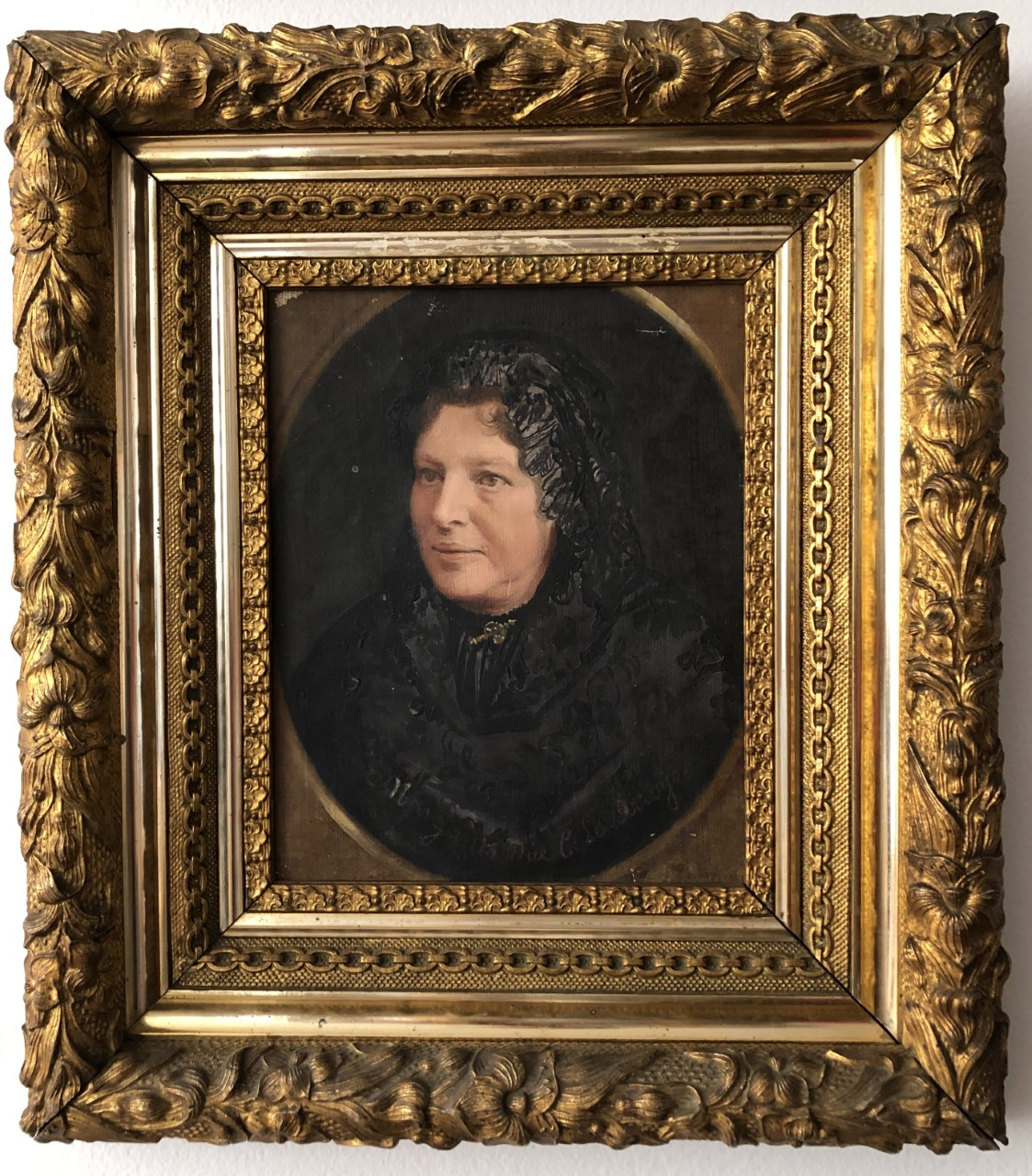
Margarita Diez-Colunje y Pombo

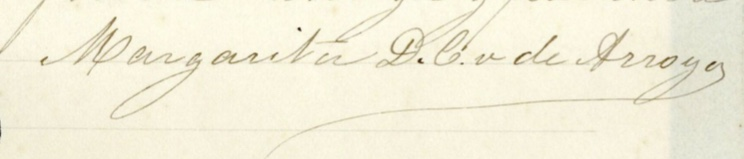
signature

Margarita Diez-Colunje y Pombo (10 June 1838 – 18 April 1919) was a Colombian historian, translator, and genealogist.

== Early life and education ==
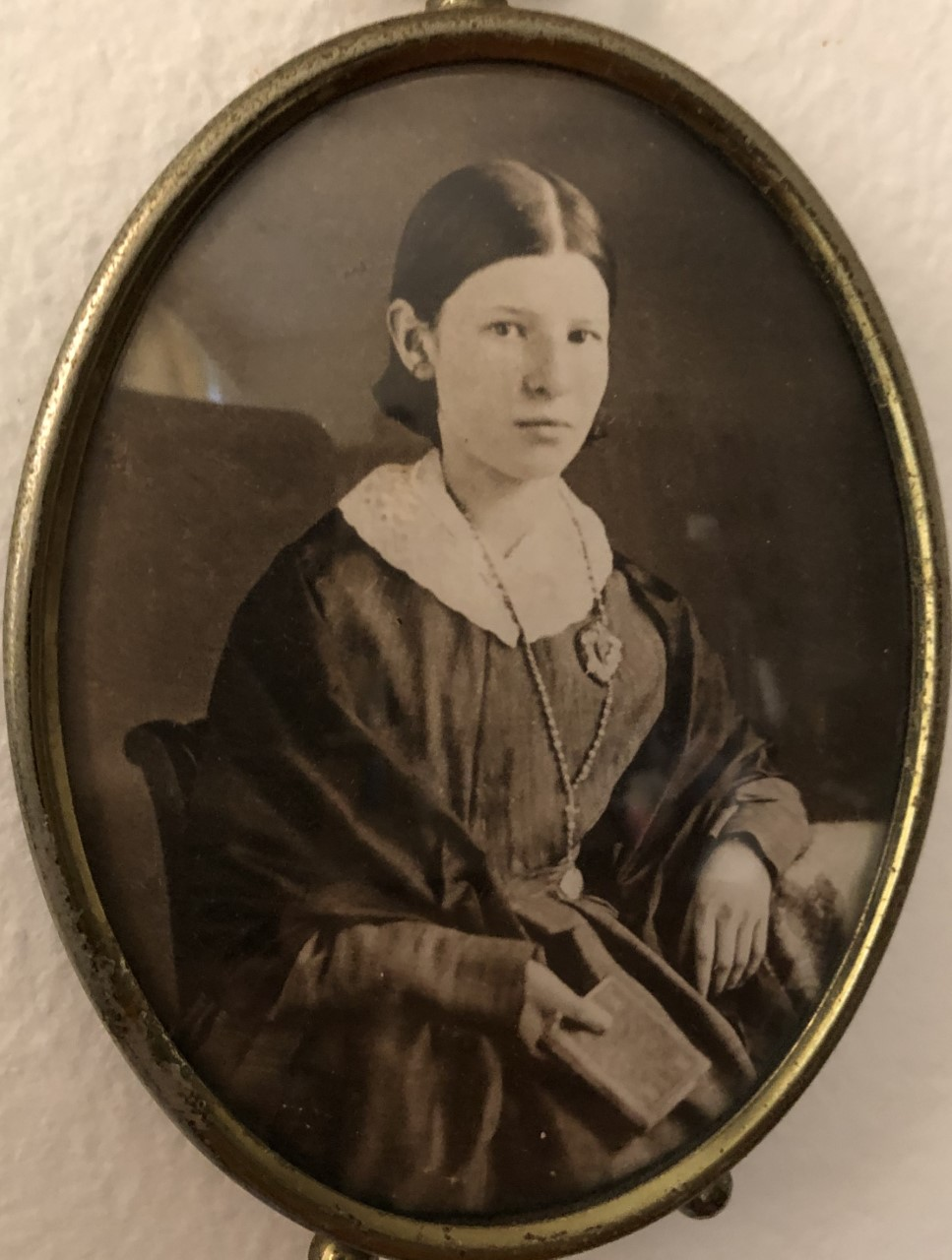
Photograph of Margarita Diez-Colunje y Pombo in her youth, based on a daguerreotype from the first half of the 19th century.

Margarita Diez-Colunje y Pombo was born in Buenaventura, Republic of New Granada on 10 June 1838. Her parents were José María Diez-Colunje Caballero, a native of the area of New Granada that is now Panama, and Natalia Pombo O'Donnell, niece of Enrique O'Donnell, Conde de La Bisbal, and cousin of Leopoldo O'Donnell, 1st Duke of Tetuan and 1st Count of Lucena. She was born in Buenaventura because her father was working at the time as a customs administrator in that city. Her baptismal godparents were her cousin, Julio Arboleda Pombo, and María Josefa Mallarino de Holguín, mother of President Carlos Holguín Mallarino.

Notable for her precocity and intelligence, she learned to read at the age of four. Her maternal aunt, Teresa Pombo O'Donnell, took charge of the child's elementary education and moved with Diez-Colunje to Bogotá, where Diez-Colunje entered the Colegio del Sagrado Corazón, a female school founded and run by Sixta Tulia Pontón y Piedrahita (1814-1861), the widow of General Francisco de Paula Santander. Upon the death of her aunt, Diez-Colunje's education and upbringing were carried out by a maternal uncle, Lino de Pombo O'Donnell.

At the Bogota campus, Diez-Colunje took classes in French, religion, history, grammar, arithmetic, geometry, geography, physics, English, music and embroidery, and had relevant figures of the time among her teachers and preceptors, including Mariano Ospina Rodríguez and José Manuel Groot. She became fluent in the French language, enough so to become an experienced translator from that language into Spanish.

== Career ==
She published several writings in the magazine Popayán, founded by her son, Miguel Arroyo Diez, and Antonino Olano.

A keen observer of the future of her time, in her Apuntamientos (Appointments), Diez-Colunje narrates in detail the circumstances of the murder of her cousin, President Julio Arboleda Pombo in 1862, as well as the seizing of Popayán by opposition forces years later, a circumstance in which her own family suffered great harassment.

In a letter dated 1893, the Panamanian historian, Juan Bautista Pérez y Soto, asks Diez-Colunje for help in gathering data on events in Cauca, destined for a book he had in preparation.

Among her unpublished work, Emigración de Popayán en 1877 y 1878 stands out, in which the author makes a detailed list of the almost 200 members of Payanese families -including hers- who were forced to emigrate to Bogotá, Quito or Lima, because of the difficult political situation prevailing in that period.

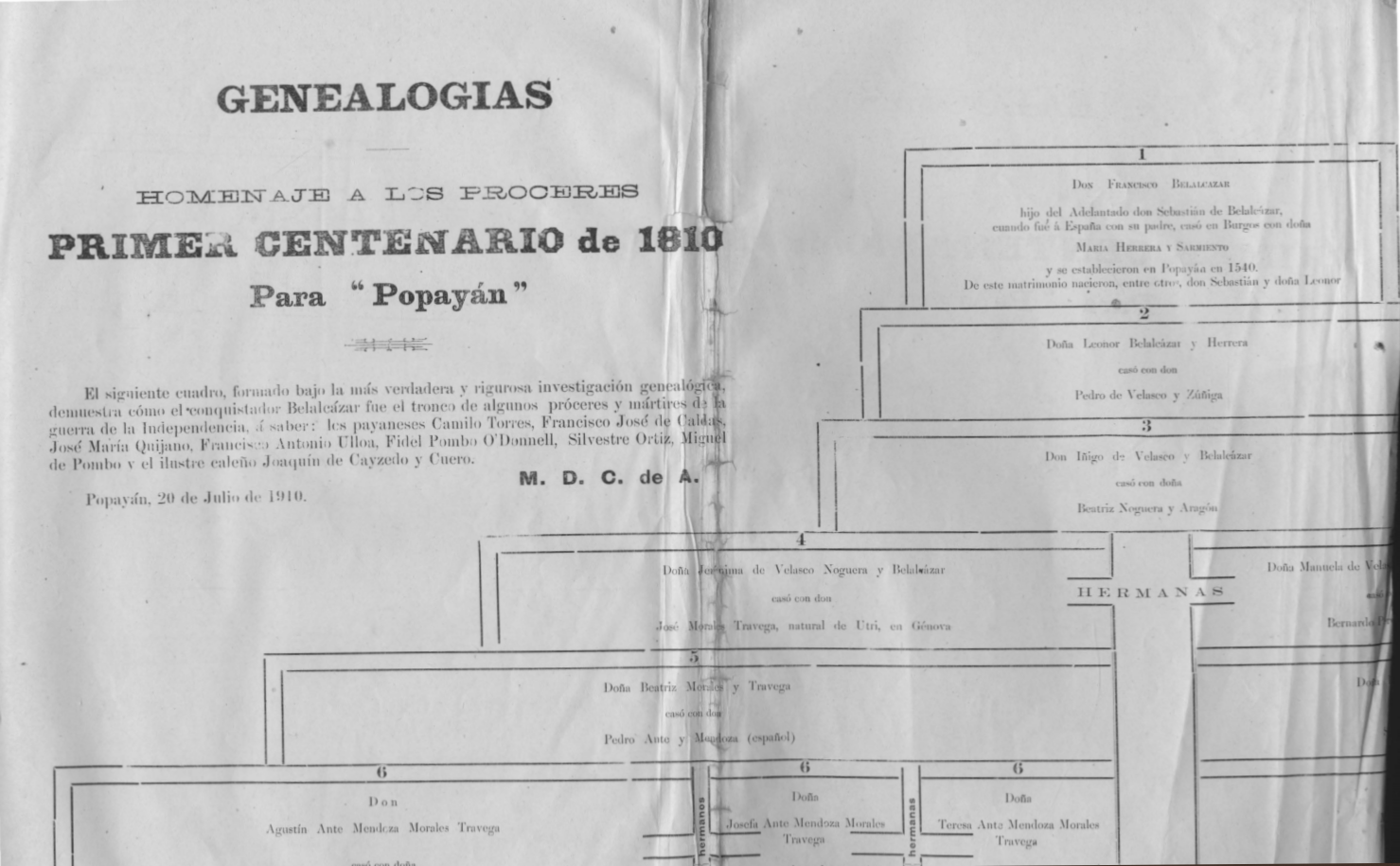
Detail of the genealogical chart prepared by Diez-Colunje for the magazine Popayán, on the occasion of the first centenary of Independence.

In 1910, on the occasion of the commemoration of the first centenary of national independence, she established and demonstrated, after meticulous historical research, that the conqueror, Sebastián de Belalcázar, was the common link of several heroes of the Independence, among them, Silvestre Ortiz, Fidel Pombo O'Donnell, Miguel de Pombo, Francisco José de Caldas, José María Quijano, Francisco José de Caldas, Camilo Torres Tenorio, and Joaquín Cayzedo y Cuero. (Note: The genealogical research of Diez was expanded and updated by Francisco Soto Pombo with data and information from subsequent generations and published in El Espectador's Sunday Magazine in 1979, under the title Los parentescos presidenciales en Colombia.) This study achieved wide recognition among historians of the time, and was printed and reproduced profusely throughout the 20th century.

Her translations from French cover historical, biographical, and lyrical themes. Among her best-accomplished texts are Los muros de una prisión, La jornada sangrienta, and María de Médicis.

Shortly before her death in 1919, Diez-Colunje wrote a profile of Ignacio Muñoz Córdoba (1857-1935), in which she describes the life of the prosperous Cauca businessman and his business boom through, among others, the purchase of numerous Cauca haciendas, including Genagra Alto, which belonged to the Arroyo family. These memoirs were compiled and transcribed posthumously by her grandson, Miguel Antonio Arroyo Arboleda, and published years later under the title Recuerdos de don Ignacio Muñoz.

== Personal life ==
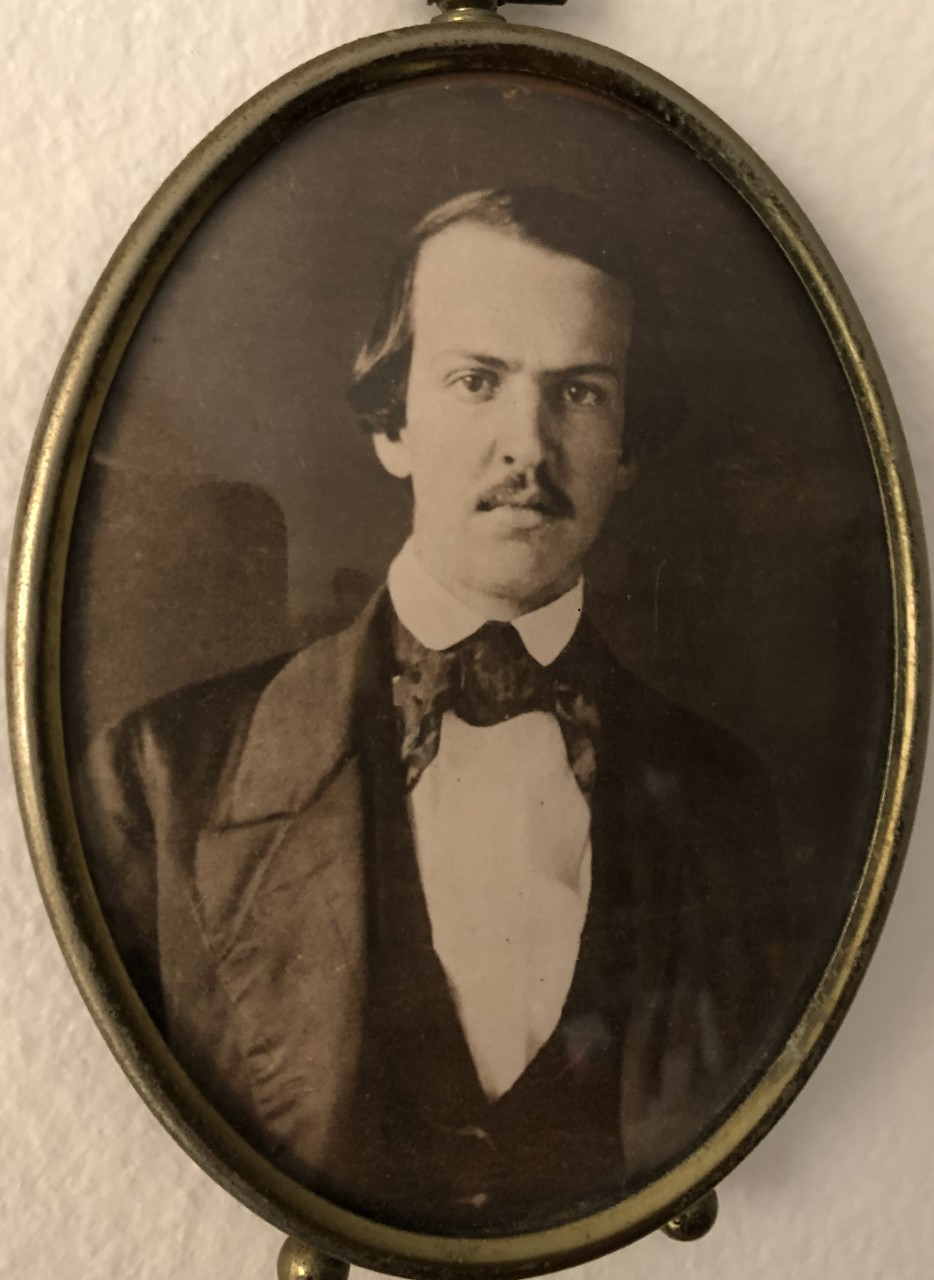
Miguel Arroyo Hurtado

On March 25, 1857, in Popayán, Diez-Colunje married the political leader, Miguel Arroyo Hurtado, with whom she had four children:

- Beatriz Arroyo Diez, celibate, artist who bequeathed numerous works in varied techniques such as pastel and oil on canvas for posterity
- Miguel Arroyo Diez, prominent politician and historian; married, María Manuela Olano Borrero
- Santiago Arroyo Diez, member of the Colombian Academy of History; married, Zoila Arboleda Sánchez
- José Antonio Arroyo Diez, mayor of Popayán in 1905; married, Sofía Arboleda Quijano

Due to the fratricidal struggles that ravaged Colombia during the second half of the 19th century, the Arroyo Diez family had to settle in Ecuador repeatedly and for long periods of time.

Diez-Colunje served as Syndic of the Brotherhood of San Antonio de Padua, established in Popayán in 1772 by a Papal brief of Pope Clement XIV, with permanent headquarters in Popayán's Iglesia de San Francisco, a family tradition that passed to her daughter, Beatriz Arroyo Diez, and from there, to her niece, Sofía Dolores Arroyo de Arboleda.

Diez-Colunje died in the Cauca capital, 18 April 1919, at the age of 81.
