= Calonge =

- Municipality
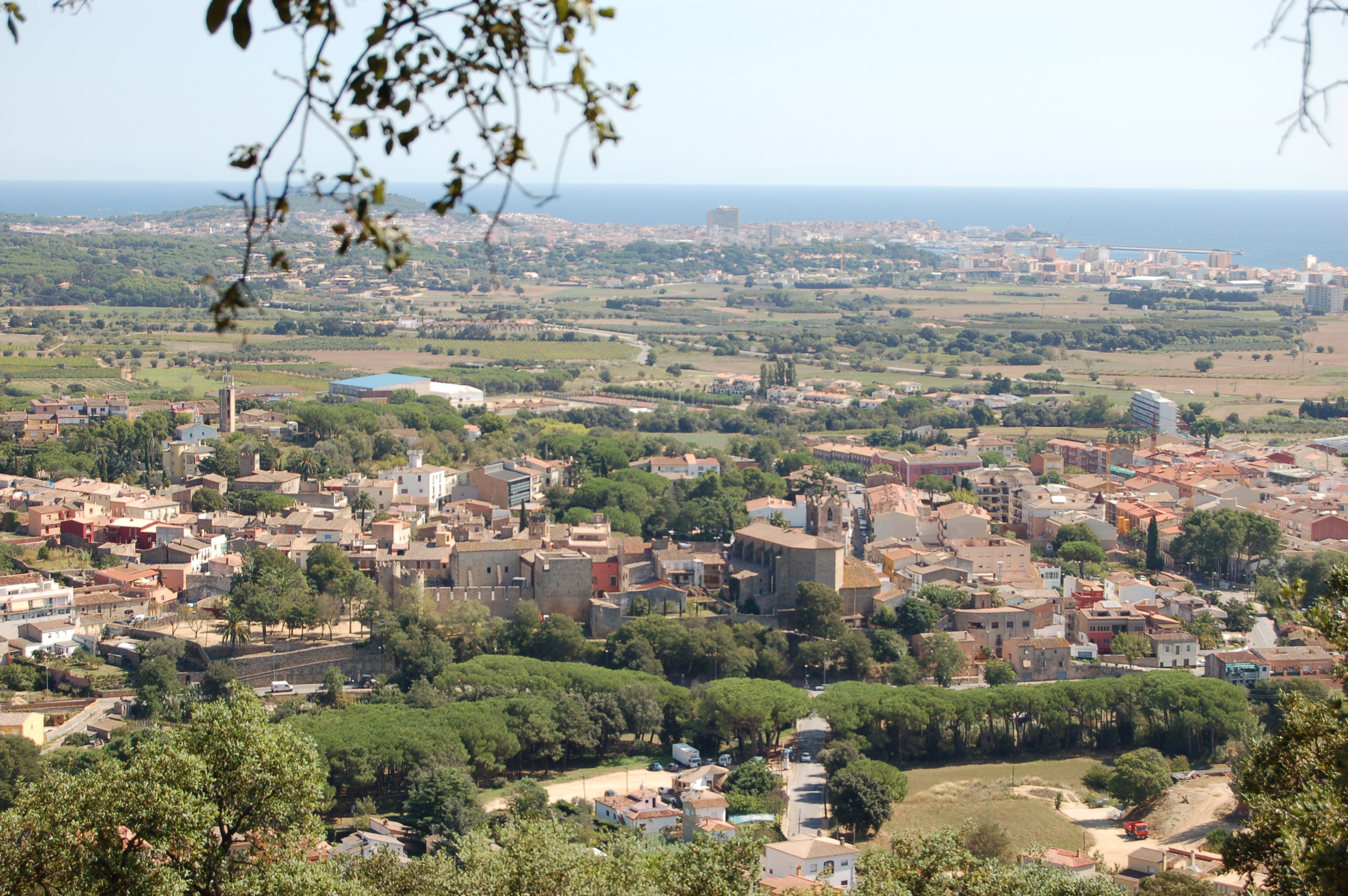

- Coat of arms

- Location within Province of Girona Location within Catalonia Location within Spain
- Coordinates: 41°51′45″N 3°04′35″E
- Country: Spain
- Community: Catalonia
- Province: Girona
- Comarca: Baix Empordà

Government
  - Mayor: Jordi Soler Casals (2015) (CiU)

Area
  - Total: 33.6 km^{2} (13.0 sq mi)
- Elevation: 22 m (72 ft)

Population (2025-01-01)
  - Total: 12,335
  - Density: 367/km^{2} (951/sq mi)
- Demonym(s): Calongí, calongina
- Website: calonge.cat

Calonge (Catalan pronunciation: [kəˈlɔɲʒə]) is a municipality in the comarca of the Baix Empordà in Catalonia, Spain, on the coastline of the Costa Brava.

The town comprises two parts, a medieval hill village and modern seaside resort. The main urban centre and original village is about 4 km inland from the Bay of Sant Antoni. The towers and walls of Calonge castle date from the thirteenth century.

Sant Antoni de Calonge, a resort, lies on the coast between Sant Feliu de Guíxols and Palamós.

The two parts are connected by GI-660 which then leads north through Las Gavarres mountains to La Bisbal d'Empordà. The C-31, the main north–south route through the Costa Brava splits the two parts.

Some of the bests campsites of the Costa Brava are located here, such as Cala Gogo, Treumal and International Calonge.

== Demography ==
1900	1930	1950	1970	1986	2006
3393	2796	2416	3941	4052	9458
