= Barville, Vosges =

Barville
- Commune
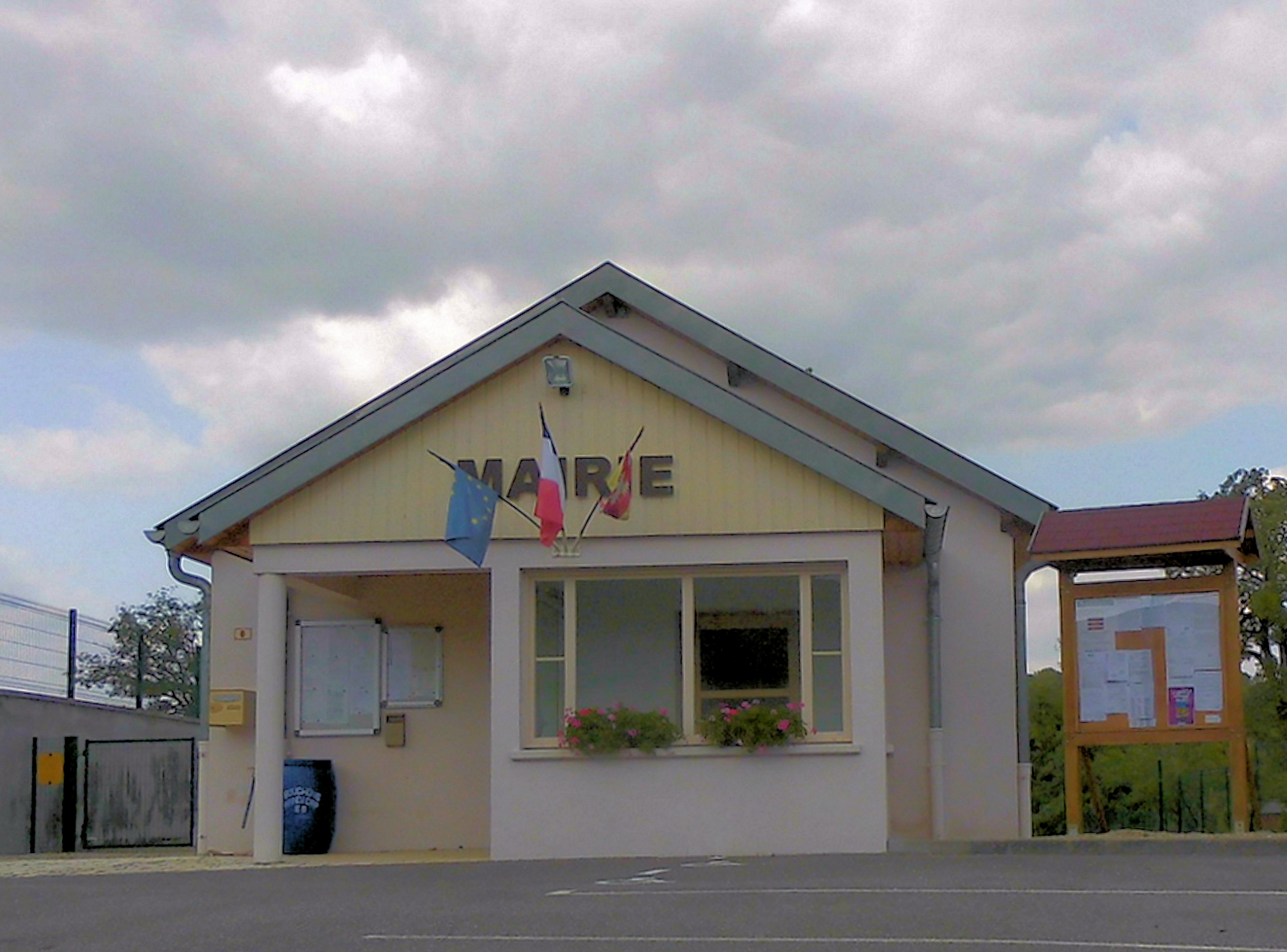
- The town hall in Barville

- Coat of arms
- Location of Barville
- Location within France Location within Grand Est
- Coordinates: 48°23′05″N 5°47′15″E
- Country: France
- Region: Grand Est
- Department: Vosges
- Arrondissement: Neufchâteau
- Canton: Neufchâteau
- Intercommunality: CC l'Ouest Vosgien

Government
  - Mayor (2020–2026): Jean-Marie Crevisy
- Area^{1}: 8.45 km^{2} (3.26 sq mi)
- Elevation: 371 m (1,217 ft)
- Highest elevation: 405 m (1,329 ft)
- Lowest elevation: 291 m (955 ft)
- Population (2023): 79
  - Density: 9.3/km^{2} (24/sq mi)
- Time zone: UTC+01:00 (CET)
  - Summer (DST): UTC+02:00 (CEST)
- INSEE/Postal code: 88036 /88300
- ^{1} French Land Register data, which excludes lakes, ponds, glaciers > 1 km^{2} (0.386 sq mi or 247 acres) and river estuaries.

Barville (French pronunciation: [baʁvil]) is a commune in the Vosges department in Grand Est in northeastern France.

== See also ==
- Communes of the Vosges department
