= Gavarres =

Mountain in Catalonia, Spain

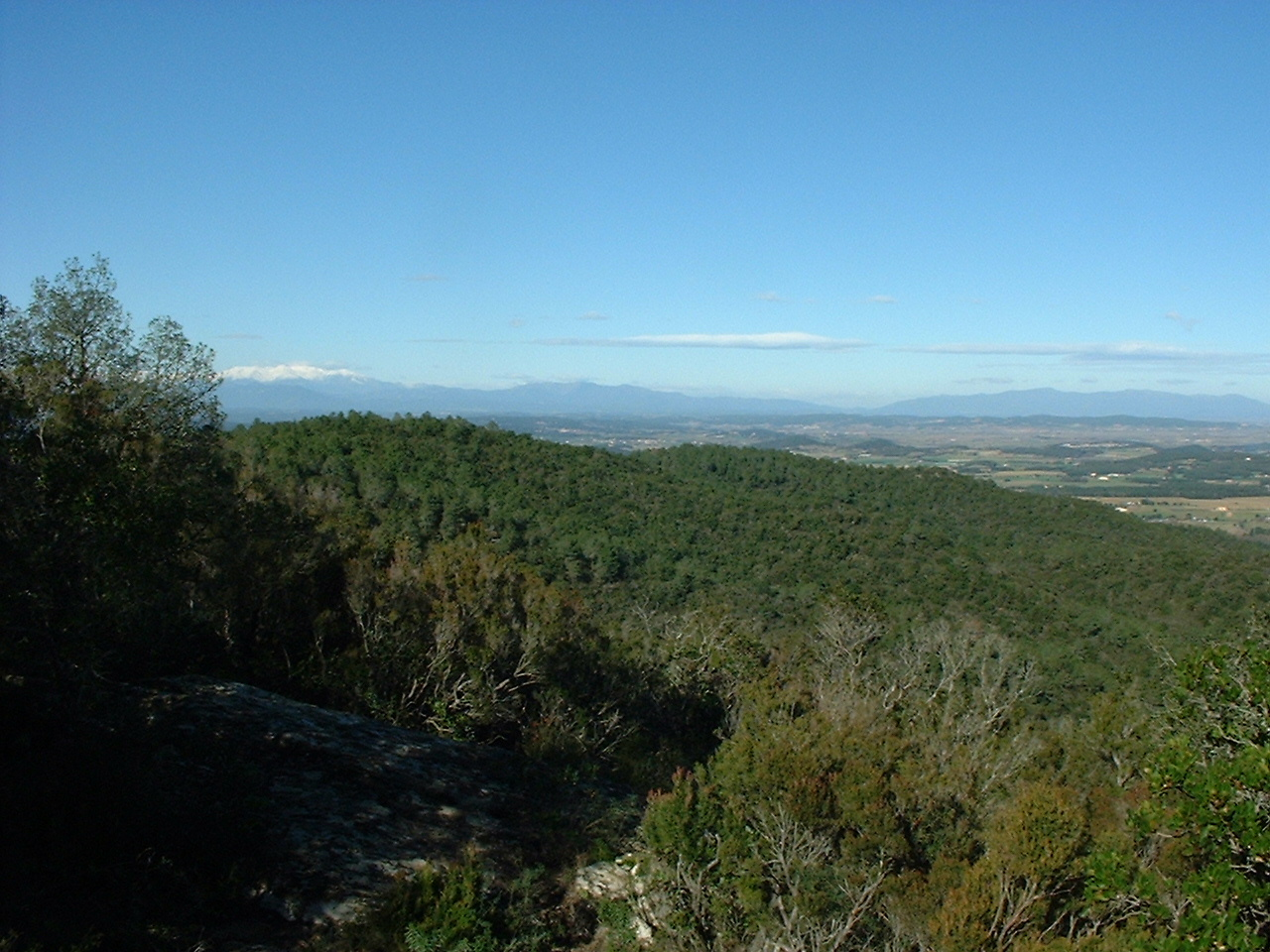
- View of the Serra de Cals in the Gavarres Massif

Highest point
- Elevation: 532 m (1,745 ft)
- Coordinates: 41°54′57″N 2°58′46″E

Geography
- Location within Catalonia
- Location: Baix Empordà, Gironès; Catalonia
- Parent range: Catalan Coastal Range

Geology
- Mountain type: Siliceous

Climbing
- First ascent: Unknown
- Easiest route: From La Bisbal d'Empordà

Les Gavarres or Massís de les Gavarres is a mountain massif in Catalonia, Spain. It is part of the Catalan Coastal Range. The highest point is Puig d'Arques, 532 m. Other important summits are Mare de Déu dels Àngels (485 m) and Santa Pellaia (353 m).

== Geography ==
The mountains run broadly north-west, south-east in the Costa Brava region. They meet the sea between Castell-Platja d'Aro and Palamós. The range runs as far west as Girona. There are a number of villages in the mountains including Romanyà de la Selva and Santa Pellaia. The mountains also include the hermitage of Mare de Déu dels Àngels where there are views of both the Sea and Pyrenees.

The ranges of the Gavarres are generally formed from granite rock, an extension from the volcanic area around Olot. Most mountainsides are covered in a dense forest of cork oak, holm oak, pine and other vegetation. Much of the Gavarres is a nature reserve.

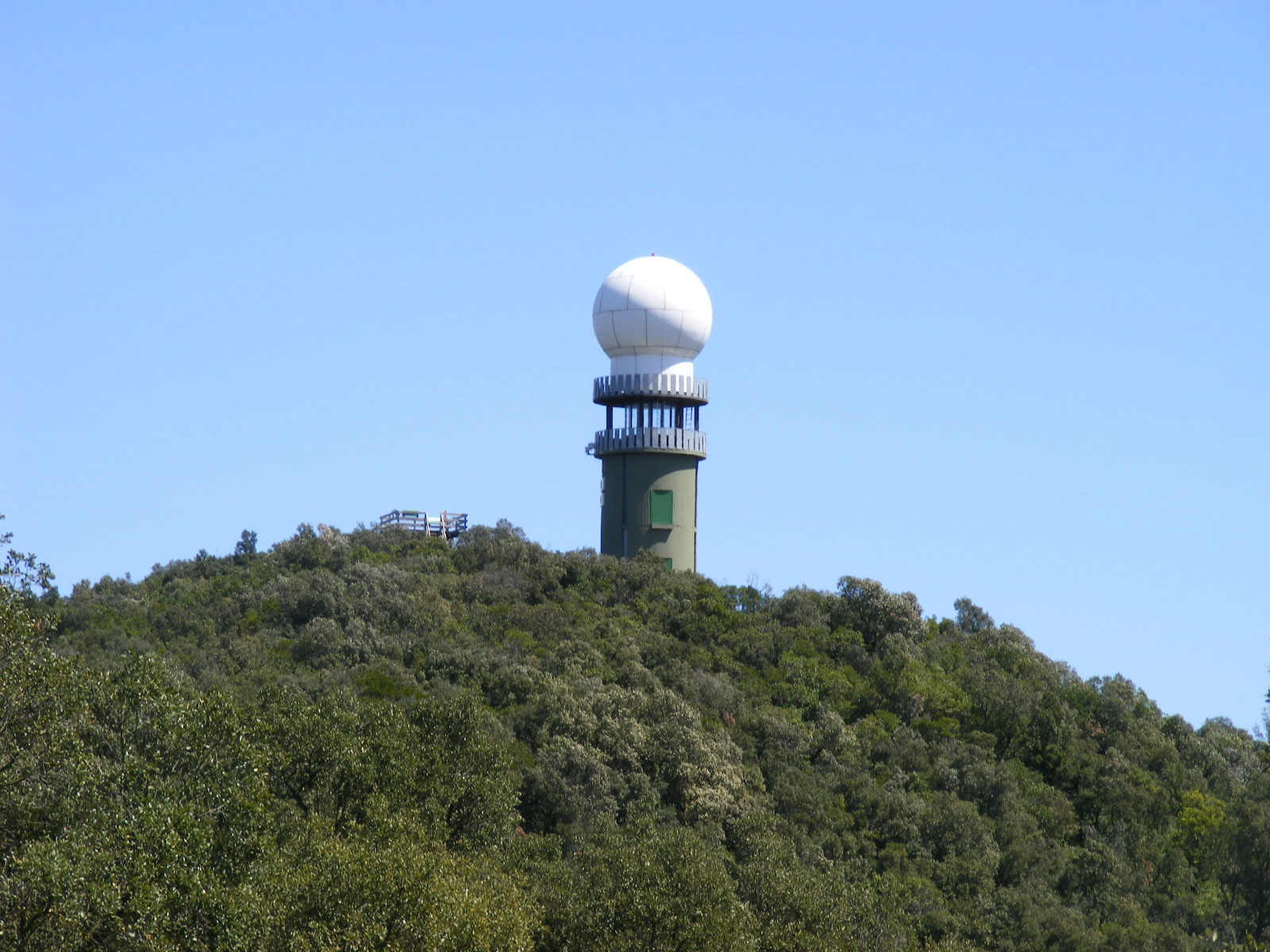
Puig d'Arques summit

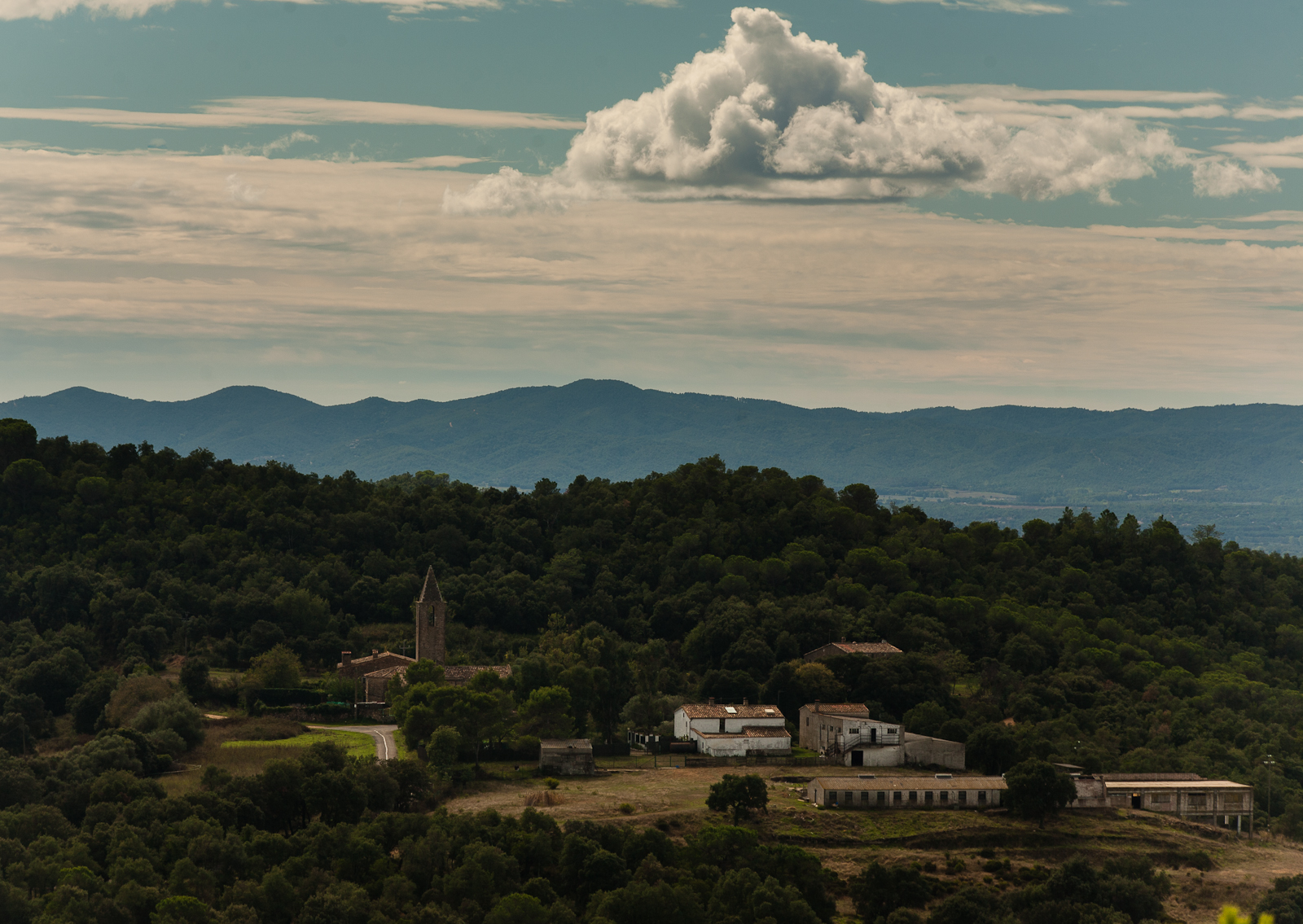
Sant Mateu de Montnegre hermitage

== See also ==
- Costa Brava
