= Marie François Rouyer =

French general (1765–1824)

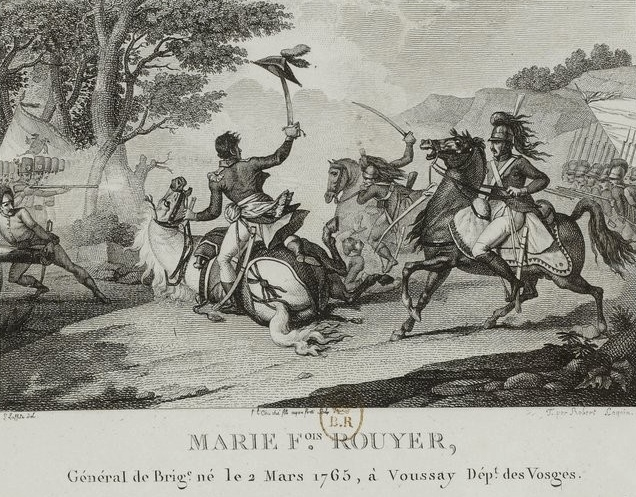
- Adjudant Général Marie François Rouyer at the battle of Fleurus, 1794.
- Born: 2 March 1765; Vouxey, Lorraine, France
- Died: 10 August 1824 (aged 59) Barville, Vosges, France
- Allegiance: Holy Roman Empire; France
- Branch: Cavalry, Infantry
- Service years: 1783–1791 (HRE); 1791–1814(?) (France)
- Rank: Lieutenant (HRE); General of Division (France)
- Conflicts: Revolt of Horea, Cloșca and Crișan; Habsburg-Ottoman War; French Revolutionary Wars; Napoleonic Wars
- Awards: Légion d'Honneur; Order of Saint Louis
- Other work: Baron of the Empire

Marie François, baron Rouyer (French pronunciation: [maʁi fʁɑ̃swa ʁuje]; 2 March 1765 – 10 August 1824) was a French general during the Napoleonic Wars.

== Biography ==
In 1783 he joined the Imperial Army of the Holy Roman Empire and became a lieutenant of dragoons within three years. He served in Transylvania and against the Ottomans but resigned and returned to France during the French Revolution. In 1791 he joined the French army as an infantry captain. He fought in the French Revolutionary Wars, becoming an Adjutant General Chef de brigade (colonel) on 12 April 1794. He won promotion to general of brigade on 30 July 1799. Napoleon Bonaparte named him a commander of the Légion d'Honneur on 14 June 1804.

Assigned to lead a brigade in the VI Corps, he fought at Haslach-Jungingen and Dürrenstein in the War of the Third Coalition. He earned advancement to general of division on 24 December 1805 but continued to lead a brigade. The following year he fought at Halle, Waren-Nossentin, and Lübeck. In the last action he captured Carl Carlsson Mörner and 600 Swedes. In 1807, he served at Mohrungen and Braunsberg before being given command of a Hessian division. He then led, for some time, the forces besieging Graudenz.

He became a Baron of the Empire on 18 March 1809. In the War of the Fifth Coalition his division of French-allied Germans guarded Napoleon's line of communications. His forces were mauled at Franzensfeste on 4 August 1809 while attempting to suppress the Tyrolean Rebellion. In early 1810 he led a division in Catalonia. In 1813 and 1814, he commanded the 2nd Division in Italy at Caldiero and the Mincio. King Louis XVIII appointed him a chevalier of the Order of Saint Louis. He was buried at Barville, Vosges on 10 August 1824. ROUYER is one of the names inscribed under the Arc de Triomphe, on Column 1.
