= Naval campaigns, operations and battles of the Napoleonic Wars =

The naval campaigns, operations and battles of the Napoleonic Wars were events during the period of World-wide warfare between 1802 and 1814 that were undertaken by European powers in support of their land-based strategies. All events included in this article represent fleet actions that involved major naval commands larger than 3–4 ships of the line, and usually commanded by a flag officer.

The period commenced with the breakdown of the Peace of Amiens on the 16 May 1803. Three days later Cornwallis began the Blockade of Brest. On 10 May 1804 William Pitt was instrumental in creating the Third Coalition.

== The Mediterranean ==
=== 1803–1804 ===
- Royal Navy blockade of the French ports (1803)
- Royal Navy blockade of the Spanish ports (1803)

=== 1805 Allied operations ===
- Anglo-Russian invasion of Naples

=== 1806–1807 Russian operations in the Adriatic ===
- Adriatic islands campaign of 1806

=== British 1807 operations ===
- Dardanelles Operation
- Battle of the Dardanelles (1807)
- Alexandria expedition of 1807

=== 1808–1814 ===
- Adriatic campaign of 1807–1814
- British Capri invasion
- British invasion of Naples (1809)
- British invasion of Sicily (1810)
- Ligurian campaign of 1814

== The West Indies ==
=== 1803–1804 ===
- Expedition to Surinam

=== 1805–1807 ===
- West Indies islands campaign

== The East Indies ==
=== 1803–1811 ===
- Linois's expedition to the Indian Ocean
- Java campaign of 1806–1807
- Mauritius campaign of 1809–1811
- Invasion of Java (1811)

== The Atlantic ==
=== 1803–1806 ===
- Royal Navy blockade of the French ports (1803)
- Royal Navy blockade of the Spanish ports (1803)
- Action of 5 October 1804
- 1805 The Trafalgar campaign
- 1805 campaign of the sea lanes (1805–1810)
- Basque Roads operation
- French commerce raiding campaign of 1805
- Buenos Aires operation of 1806
- Escape of the Portuguese fleet

=== Peninsular War 1808–13 ===
- British landing in Portugal (1808)
- Evacuation of the La Romana Division
- Capture of the Rosily Squadron
- 1809 Corunna and Vigo evacuation
- British landing in Portugal (1809)
- Royal Navy Peninsular War supply operation

=== Anglo-American War of 1812–15 ===
- List of naval battles of the War of 1812
- 1813–1814 High Seas operations
- 1813–1814 Great Lakes operations

== The North Sea ==
=== 1807 destruction of the Danish navy ===
- Gunboat War

=== 1809 ===
- Walcheren Campaign

== The Baltic Sea ==
- Royal Navy supply of Prussian fortresses

=== Russo-Swedish War of 1808–09 ===
- The Russo-Swedish 1809 Campaign

=== Anglo-Swedish War (1810–1812) ===
- Anglo-Swedish War (1810–1812)

== Anglo-Russian War (1807-1812) ==
- Anglo-Russian War (1807-1812)
  - Battle of the Nargö
