= Klågerup riots =

1811 popular rebellion in the province of Scania, Sweden

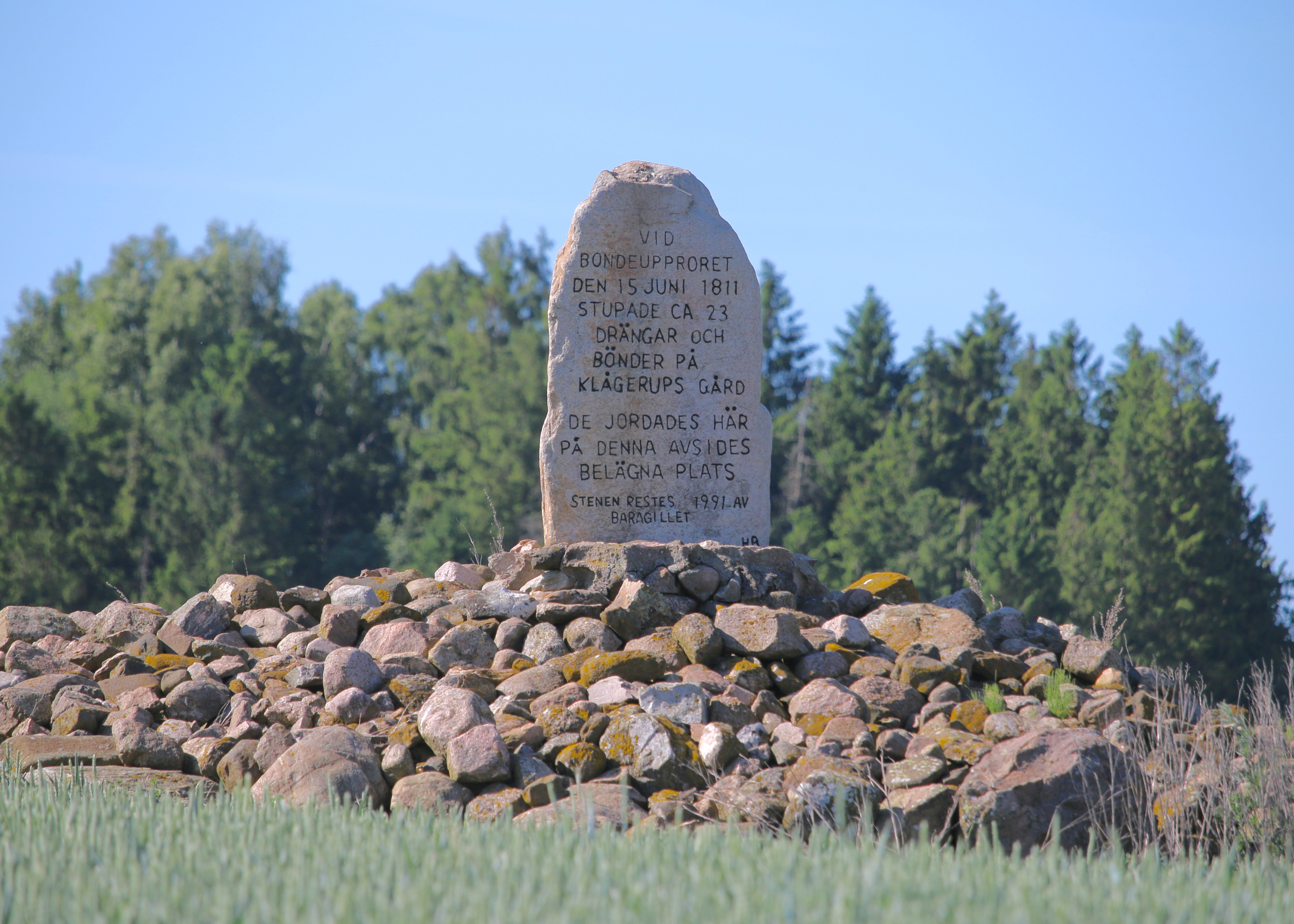
Memorial for those killed in the riots 1811

The Klågerup riots (Swedish: Klågerupskravallerna) is the name for a series of Swedish rebellions which took place in Scania in Sweden in the summer of 1811.

That year a series of rebellions took place in Scania, caused by discontent about, among other things, the draft for military service. This led to demonstrations by civilian armies of peasantry, who demanded negotiations with the authorities. The rebels also attacked and plundered some estates belonging to the nobility.

The name Klågerup riots are given to the events from the end of the affair: the last forces of the rebel army, gathered at Klågerup, refused to surrender and was attacked by the military on 15 June 1811, leading to some 30 dead from gunshots at once (23 of them died in Klågerup), and several more who later died from infected wounds.

Hundreds were brought in chains to Malmöhus Castle, which partly served as a prison.

== See also ==
- Maria Nilsdotter i Ölmeskog
- Anglo-Swedish War
- Tullberg Uprising

== Sources ==
- Birger Persson: Bondeupproret i Skåne: Ett 150-årsminne. Särtryck ur Ystads Allehanda, 20/5, 27/5, 3/6 1961.
- Gösta Johannesson: Skånes historia. Signum 1977.
- K Arne Blom och Jan Moen: Slagfält i Skåneland. Liber 1986.
- Gert-Ove Pettersson & Sven Rosborn m.fl.: 1811. Bondeupproret i Skåne. Malmö 1991. ISBN 91-9711-819-2
- Mats Olsson, Sten Skansjö och Kerstin Sundberg: Gods och bönder från högmedeltid till nutid: kontinuitet genom omvandling på Vittskövle och andra skånska gods. Nordic Academic Press 2006, ISBN 9189116593.
- Alf Åberg: Skånes historia i fickformat. Natur & Kultur 1997, ISBN 9127068838.
