= William Monteith =

British soldier, diplomatist and historian

William Monteith, R.A., K.L.S., F.R.S., F.R.G.S. (22 June 1790 – 18 April 1864) was a British soldier, diplomatist and historian, associated with the East India Company.

== Early life and career ==
William Monteith was born in the Abbey parish, Paisley, Renfrewshire, on 22 June 1790. On 18 March 1809 he was appointed a lieutenant in the Madras engineers, and became captain in that corps on 2 May 1817, lieutenant-colonel on 4 November 1824, colonel on 13 May 1839 (brevet on 18 June 1831).

== Persian mission ==
Monteith accompanied Sir John Malcolm's embassy to Persia, and when at Tabriz, in February 1810, was sent to reconnoitre the Russian frontier-posts on the Aras, near Megeri, at the request of Abbas Mirza, the prince royal of Persia. When Malcolm's embassy quit Persia, Monteith was one of the officers left behind. During the Russo-Persian War, he went with Abbas Mirza to Erivan, and accompanied an expedition into Georgia, in which the Persians were unsuccessful. During the four succeeding campaigns against the Russians in 1810-13 Monteith was in command of a frontier force of cavalry with six guns, and of the garrison of Erivan. He was engaged in many skirmishes, and once was wounded. The war against Russia was supported by the British minister, Sir Harford Jones Brydges but Napoleon's retreat from Moscow brought about a reversal of British policy. When Henry Ellis and David Richard Morier concluded the treaty of Teheran between Great Britain and Persia, which was signed on 25 November 1814, and remained in force until the war of 1857, Monteith acted as secretary to Morier. He was still in Persia in 1819, and acted as aide-de-camp to Sir William Keir Grant, commanding the Bombay force sent against the Wahhabi pirates of the Persian Gulf, which destroyed their stronghold of Ras al-Khaimah. He was present with the Persians during the war with Turkey. He was then employed to ascertain the boundary between Persia and Turkey.

During the Russo-Persian War (1826–1828), Monteith was present at the Persian headquarters. After the Treaty of Turkmenchay was signed in 1828, Monteith was appointed commissioner for the payment of the indemnity, exacted from Persia by Russia, part of which was conveyed by him personally into the Russian camp. He was thus brought into contact with the Russian commander, General Ivan Paskevich, which led to his presence at the Russian headquarters at Tiflis during the war between the Russians and Turks in 1828. He was ordered to remain in Persia until the settlement of the Russo-Persian boundary.

== Service in India ==
Monteith left Persia in October 1829, and on his way home was present with the French army at the capture of Algiers in July 1830. He returned to India in July 1832, and was appointed chief engineer at Madras, but in January 1834 was superseded by the arrival of Colonel Gurnard. Monteith then became superintending engineer at the presidency, but on Gurnard's death, 2 September 1836, he again became chief engineer, and an ex officio member of the military board, a position he held to 18 July 1842. He became a major-general on 23 November 1841, retired from the service in 1847, and attained the honorary rank of lieutenant-general in 1854. He died at his residence, Upper Wigmore Street, London, on 18 April 1864, aged 73. He was a Fellow of the Royal Society and of the Royal Geographical Society, a member of various foreign learned societies, and a knight of the Persian Order of the Lion and the Sun.

== Works ==
Monteith wrote Kars and Erzeroum, with the Campaign of Prince Paskiewitch (London, 1856), an account of the Russian wars in the Caucasus, as well as several works on the geography of Persia and India. He also translated The Diplomatists of Europe by the French author Jean-Baptiste Honoré Raymond Capefigue (London, 1845) and edited Narrative of the Conquest of Finland by the Russians in 1808-9 (London, 1854).

== Family ==
Monteith married Maria Murdoch (1805-1873) at Trinity Church, St Marylebone, London 23 August 1831. She was the daughter of Thomas Murdoch IV and his wife, Charlotte Leacock, a Merchant of Madeira. Monteith and his wife had the following children, born in India: Caroline Frederica (1832-1916), William Elphinstone (1835-1841) and Horator Murdoch (1838-1846)
