= Tullberg Uprising =

Swedish revolt, 1867–1869

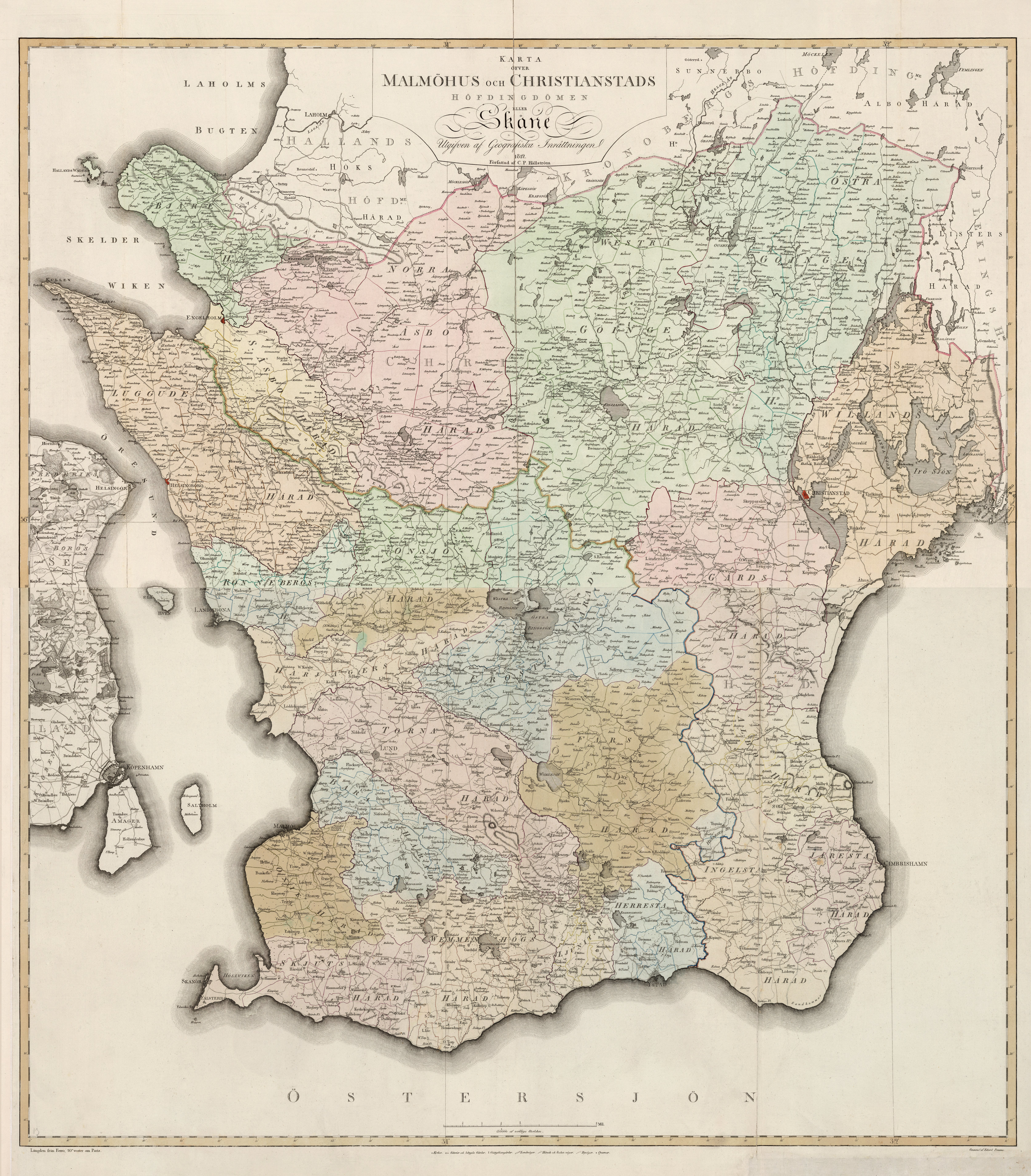
- Map of Scania in 1805.
Date	1867–1869
Location	Scania, Sweden
Result	Noble/Government victory

Belligerents
Tullberg movement	Sweden; Scanian nobility Loyalist farmers

Commanders and leaders
Samuel Tullberg (POW); Johannes Andersson (POW); Mätta Mårtensdotter; Eskil Larsson (POW)	Samuel von Troil; A. Gyllensvärd; Johan Stoltz; Jöns Krook

Units involved
	Swedish bailiffs Swedish police Swedish Army: South Scanian Infantry Regiment; Småland grenadierregiment; Hussarregiment Karl XV

Strength
500–1,500	~169 Soldiers (Note: Combining the number of soldiers deployed.); ~16 Auxiliaries; Several sheriffs

Casualties and losses
Several arrested Unknown wounded	Several estates damaged Several wounded

The Tullberg uprising was an armed rebellion carried out by the Tullberg movement under Samuel Tullberg over disputes with the nobility over land ownership in the Swedish region of Scania. The farmers of Scania had even since the time when they were a part of the Danish empire, lived on the lands of the nobles and had to pay hefty amounts of rent to the upper class. However, claims by Samuel Tullberg of the nobility's ownership of the farmlands being illegitimate would see the refusal by the Scanians to pay the nobles for residing in their lands. Due to his claims, Samuel Tullberg's house would be raided by the authorities and he would be put into custody after a confrontation with his followers in Trannebygget and Kärrstorp on vague accusations of treason. However, due to outrage from the public and the support of the Lantmanna Party, he and the others arrested were allowed to go free. The Tullberg movement would continue their fight long into the future, though, without resorting to violence.

== Background ==
The Swedish farmers of Scania had long been living and working on the farmlands of the local nobility, thus making the upper class entitled to the farmer's rent and services. The economic advantages of the Scanian nobility had often been the cause of local uprisings and revolts as the farmers alleged that their income had been unjustly taken from them by the upper class. However, the farmers had never quite gotten the upper hand as the authorities would often pick the side of the nobility when conflicts erupted leading to much bloodshed on the farmer's side. Although the superiority of the nobility over the peasantry was not something exclusive to Scania, the power balance between the two continued to exist long into the 19th century which made it a local phenomenon as farmers in the rest of Sweden did reside on the noble's land.

=== Tullberg movement ===
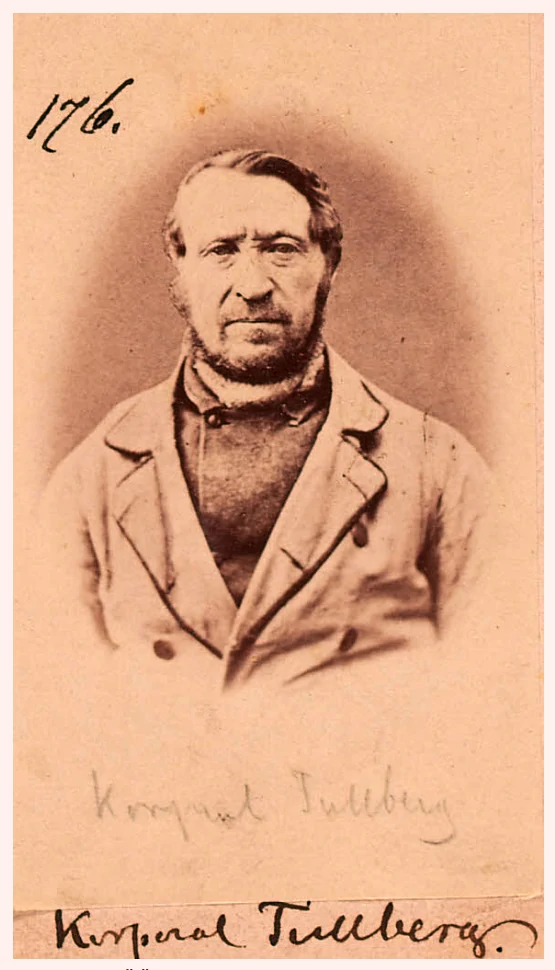
Picture of Samuel Tullberg

Scanian farmers followed the national trend of becoming more educated during the 19th century as numerous schools opened up throughout Scania, making them a more integral part of the Swedish society and economy. The developments in education would change the Scanian farmers' way of fighting the nobility as they could now engage them diplomatically, leading to a sharp decline in farmers' uprisings in Sweden during the 19th century. Although, between 1810 and 1860, the number of Scanian farmers living under the nobility decreased from 8,189 to 4,848, the rent that the nobles charged drastically went up making the farmers evermore desperate for change. At the beginning of 1867, the lawyer Samuel Tullberg and his companion David Malmqvist, seeking to de-legitimize the validity of the nobility's claims upon Scanian farmland, read through numerous old documents detailing the ownership of the local land dating back hundreds of years. He concluded that the nobles did not have a strong claim over the farmlands due to the land reforms of 1789 and 1809-10. Samuel Tullberg argued that the lands on which the Scanian farmers resided were kronojord (Crown land) which under Swedish law would allow the tenant of the Kronojord to redeem the land thus making it their own. Although he had misinterpreted the documents and the upper class was in their full right to collect rent from the farmers, the 'Tullberg movement' (Swedish: Tullbergska rörelsen) received 252 new members as a result and Tullberg became a local celebrity. Much to the dismay of the nobility, the rise in membership in the Tullberg movement coincided with the mass refusal of 426 Scanian farmers to pay their rent, and thousands more were now attempting to purchase the farmland for themselves with the Tullberg movement's help.

== Legal battle ==
In the autumn of 1867, the farmers of the Barsebäck requested Samuel Tullberg's aid in a legal struggle against the noble landowners over the lands. This was not Tullberg's first visit to Barsebäck, the Barsebäck farmers had sought to redeem their land even as far back as 1856 which had culminated in the Råbelöf War where Tullberg played a minor role. However, as Tullberg made his statements of the illegitimacy of the nobility's claims upon their land, a conflict sparked up again in Barsebäck as in the rest of Scania. 27 people from Barsebäck and Hofterup gathered together to sue their local landlord Adolf Wathier Hamilton attempting to redeem their land. Many others (Note: The members of the Tullberg movement were not a homogenous group, it is estimated that more than half of its members were not farmers but rather of the lower-poor class.) were attempting to do the same and by the end of the year, 122 farmers were engaged in a legal battle against the nobility and thousands more were not paying their rent.

=== Mätta Mårtensdotter's delegation to Stockholm ===
Mätta Mårtensdotter would play a crucial role in organizing the farmers around Röddinge to Tullberg's cause, she mobilized 159 farmers to redeem their land and refuse to pay the local Piper family thus making her a lead figure in the movement. Mattä Mårtendotter traveled up to Stockholm to present their case in front of the king of Sweden with five other farmers, Karl XV, the delegation was to only be made up of the most important figures of the movement. However, the King did not want to speak with farmers and made them wait for a long stretch of time likely in the hopes for them to give up and return home. Thanks to a Scanian politician, the King would eventually converse with the farmers, though, not with Mätta Mårtensdotter as she was a woman. Nevertheless, the King refused to fight for their cause. Mätta Mårtensdotter would later move to North America having given up on the Tullberg movement's fight. Many more farmers later, in a similar fashion, also moved up to Stockholm to put their case forward in the press seeing much success as the Tullberg movement cause became a discussed matter.

The Tullberg movement had, though, continued to expand throughout 1868 even without the king's help, reaching all throughout Scania, though, it saw little success. The county governor, Samuel Von Troil, had dismissed all the petitions and lawsuits and the Häradsrätt had not even taken to time to review the case, many landowners were now starting counter lawsuits as well. However, the farmers continued to refuse to pay their bills and fulfill their obligations leading to heightened tensions with the nobility as the strikes continued.

== Uprising ==
As a response to the refusal of cooperation by the farmers, the nobility began evicting rebellious farmers from their land. The farmers responded with heavy resistance, authority personnel attempting to carry out the eviction would often be fired upon by a farmers' mob or physically assaulted as was the case for numerous villages. However, The Tullberg movement would often be on the offensive attacking noble residences and persons with whom they had engaged legally. On the 14 and 15th of November, a case of arson had been reported in Barseback, it was only in March of the next year were the perpetrator was found to be Lars Nilsson who was charged with attempted murder. These assaults on residences often led to the perpetrator's arrest and they often did not achieve their aims when attacking the nobility, nevertheless, violent poaches continued. There had even been some cases of attacks on those who refused to join the Tullberg movement.

Not all resistance was violent, however, the illegal hunting of roe deer on noble land was a symbolic form of claiming the land for the farmers, and the incident became much talked about in the area.

The first evictions took place in November 1868, Von Troil had sent a large force to aid the authorities to hopefully prevent any resistance from the Scanians who had proven to be capable of engaging the government. The evictions continued into 1869 with the occasional resistance from the farmers, a common form of resistance was house occupations, that being weaponizing the residence and locking up anyway in, which had proved quite effective. When Per Nillson was to be evicted for not fulfilling his obligations, a huge mob of farmers gathered to deter the authorities. Von Troil, fearing that the situation could get out of hand, ordered 1 hussar squadron, and two south Scanian infantry battalions to assist the evictors. The news of a military escalation made many farmers try to illegally auction off their land to avoid getting involved in a similar eviction. Reports of these actions came from the villages of Bromma, Borrie, Bjersjöholm, Krageholm, and Högestad, the actions also served as a statement of the validity of the farmer's claims. Yet, the authorities continued to be harassed upon entering rebellious villages.

When evictions in Kärrstorp were to take place in late 1868 to early 1869, violence ensued. The gathered mob of farmers at first restricted themselves to verbally abusing and threatening the authorities, though things escalated when Christian Andersson was to be evicted on the 11th of December. Witthoff arrived at Andersson's farm with a dozen government personnel, though, upon entering Andersson's residence, the farmer refused to cooperate with the authorities. An argument broke out between the authorities and him which became physical. Hearing the commotion, 20-30 neighbors went into the residence to aid Andersson and quickly drove out the law enforcement. Three days later, Per Olsson was also to be evicted in December 1869 but there was resistance from a large farmer mob. After a standoff with 75 soldiers of the South Scanian Infantry Regiment and 12 auxiliaries, Per Olsson would get his eviction.

By now, the nobleman Arvid Posse, who had faced the wrath of the farmers, sought a way to imprison the leadership of the Tullberg movement to minimize the risk of its spread across the country. On vague legal grounds on the 13th of February, Arvid Posse managed to get Samuel Tullberg and his allies wanted for treason, and large military forces were deployed to Scania to conduct a county-wide manhunt. 500 riksdalers were offered to those willing to betray Samuel Tullberg and reveal his location. On the 16th of February at 9 pm, 9 armed government figures entered an estate in Tranebygget where Samuel Tullberg was suspected of hiding. Due to Von Troil's presence in the Riksdag, the group was to be led by A Gyllensvärd. Samuel Tullberg would be quickly detained after a short chase in the residence where 7 shots were fired, miraculously, none of the shots fired hit Tullberg.

Two days later on the 18th, one of the wanted lead figures of the Tullberg movement, Eskil Larsson, would gather a large armed force of farmers in Kärrstorp as a response to Tullbergs arrest. The military was seen as necessary to take down the farmers as the police and sheriffs were not able to put down the uprising. As Von Troil still was absent from Scania, it was Jöns Krook who would carry out the operations. 54 hussars from the Karl XV Hussar regiment and 40 grenadiers from the Småland Grenadier regiment were deployed to advance toward the rebel town of Kärrstorp. Several shots were fired between the two, but the farmers' mob eventually dispersed due to the military might before them and Eskil Larsson was detained.

== Aftermath ==
=== Samuel Tullberg's trial ===
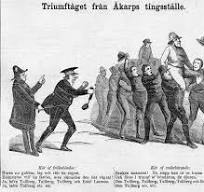
Celebration after Samuel Tullberg's charges were dropped.

Shortly after his arrest, Samuel Tullberg was taken to Gustafsborg where he was guarded throughout the night due to fears of an assault by the farmers. He later departed to Helsingborg, but the governor refused to house him due to fears of attacks from the peasantry, so he was taken to Malmö with the steamboat Frej. Samuel Tullberg along with Eskil Larsson was accused of treason by the noble Arvid Posse. However, the public would overwhelmingly side with Samuel Tullberg and numerous of his followers showed up to court as witnesses to denounce the charges of treason, and Tullberg and his followers would all be acquitted of all charges or receive little repercussions. After Tullberg's release, an additional 20 evictions were carried out through 1869.

The Tullberg movement would continue to exist long into the future as a political movement with the goal of giving more liberties to the farmers of Sweden, though, progress was slow. At the death of Samuel Tullberg in 1882, the Swedish farmers had not yet gotten the right to vote.

== See also ==
- Klågerup riots
- Böda Uprising
