= Treaties of Örebro =

1812 peace treaty between the UK, Sweden, and the Russian Empire

Treaty of Örebro
Treaty of Peace, Union, and Friendship, between His Britannic Majesty and the Emperor of all the Russias Treaty of Peace, Union, and Friendship, between His Britannic Majesty and the King of Sweden
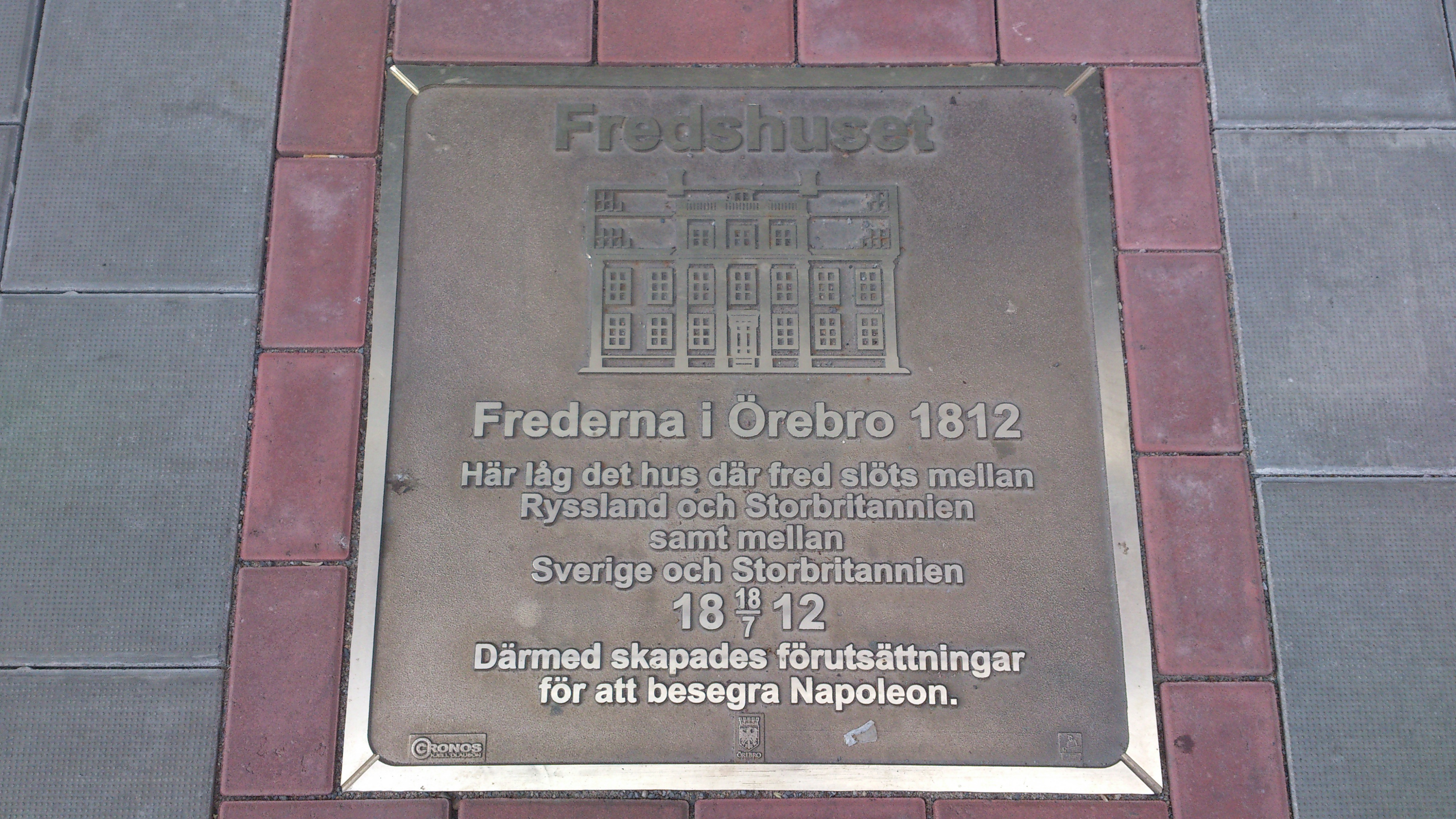
- Memorial plate from 2012 about the Treaty of Örebro 1812
- Type: Bilateral treaty
- Signed: 18 July 1812
- Location: Örebro, Sweden
- Original signatories: Sweden; United Kingdom; Russian Empire
- Ratifiers: Sweden; United Kingdom; Russian Empire

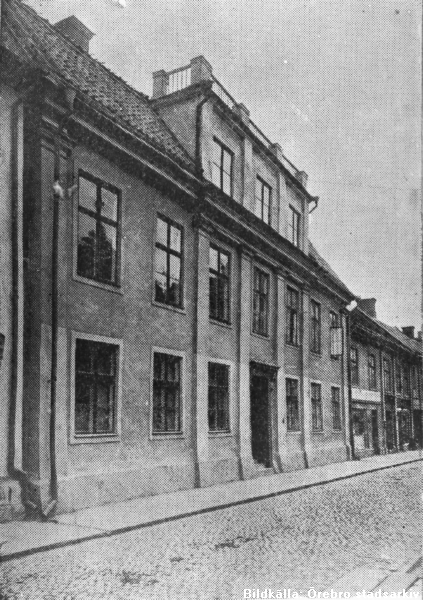
The building in Örebro where the treaties were signed in 1812

Two Treaties of Örebro (Note: the full names being the Treaty of Peace, Union, and Friendship, between His Britannic Majesty and the Emperor of all the Russias and the Treaty of Peace, Union, and Friendship, between His Britannic Majesty and the King of Sweden) were signed on the same day, 18 July 1812, in Örebro, Sweden. Negotiated by the British minister-plenipotentiary in Sweden, Edward Thornton, they formally ended the Anglo-Russian War (1807–1812) and the Anglo-Swedish War (1810–1812), neither of which had seen serious military action.

== Description ==
The Treaties of Örebro consisted of two separate agreements, both signed on 18 July 1812, with the following key provisions:

- Treaty between Britain and Russia: This treaty formally ended the Anglo-Russian War (1807–1812). It restored peace, renewed diplomatic and commercial relations, and established a framework for mutual cooperation. Both parties agreed to cease hostilities and reaffirmed their commitment to friendship and alliance, particularly in light of their shared opposition to Napoleon's expansion in Europe.
- Treaty between Britain and Sweden: This treaty concluded the Anglo-Swedish War (1810–1812), which had seen no significant military action. It reestablished peaceful relations, ensured the resumption of trade, and confirmed diplomatic ties. The treaty also paved the way for Sweden's alignment with Britain and Russia in the broader coalition against Napoleon, supporting Sweden's strategic shift under the leadership of Crown Prince Bernadotte.
