= Böda Uprising =

1850 event in Sweden

- Part of the Öland forest conflicts
Date	March–April, 1850
Location	Öland
Result	Uprising quelled

Belligerents
Sweden	(Öland) Insurgents

Commanders and leaders
Stenius; Henrik Eneman	Simon Nilsson

Units involved
Forest guard Kalmar Regiment	

Strength
110 Soldiers	50–80

Casualties and losses
Several wounded	Unknown

The Böda Uprising (Swedish: Bödaupproret), also known as the Forest Rebellion (Swedish: Skogsupproret) was an uprising regarding the rights of the Ölanders to the forest. The uprising was sparked over disputes over the king's claims upon the forest in Öland as the islanders saw their generational heritage as a good enough reason to exploit the forest's resources.

The forest guard had failed to prevent the islanders from exploiting the forest, so the commander, Stenius, requested the assistance of the regional government in Kalmar to arrest anyone found to have illegally extracted wood in their homes. The request would be granted and a large group of government personnel would head over to the island. However, the officials were forced off the island by a large mob of locals and the rebellion had to be quelled by the Swedish military a month later.

== Background ==
=== Forest policy ===
The forest around Böda had been a royal hunting park from 1569 until 1801 when a new forest policy was implemented by the Swedish Government, where the forest was seen as capital to be improved with long-term plans. In accordance with this policy, the public park in Böda was turned into crown property, with the state claiming full ownership and rights to the forest which thus forbid any locals from accessing the forest's resources. As the local economy largely relied on the forest for its various resources, it would take a hit if the locals were prohibited from exploiting the forest, and as Öland was at the time one of the poorest regions of Sweden at the time, it was especially vulnerable to economic hardships.

Although, after 1836 the local population at Böda was able to purchase the wood of the forest through government actions, the price would often be much too overinflated for the poor local population. However, the new laws regarding the forest would be widely ignored by the locals, even amidst the presence of the forest guard. The small force in charge of keeping the forest out of the hands of the locals was unable to due to their lack of dedication to their job, many would just turn a blind eye upon witnessing illegal activities taking place and some would even actively participate in such practices.

== Prelude ==
The years leading up to 1850 were characterized by ramped deforestation not yet seen before. Between 1848 and 1850 alone, 94,000 cubic feet of forest were illegally cut down by the locals. This high number could be partly attributed to the high population growth in Böda. Nevertheless, the severely understaffed forest guard was unable to bring the thousands of local inhabitants to justice, and heightened tensions often led to physical confrontations when doing so. The forest guard Korseman had been badly beaten by the locals two times while on duty, once in 1846 and once in 1848. 1848 also saw an additional pair of guards get severely while on their night shift.

Hellbom had to be put out of commission for several weeks due to the severity of the wounds that he had suffered while on his nightly shift and Enander would be struck by an axe to his neck. Even if the forest guard caught a local stealing wood, they would more often than not never show up to court and stay at home un-punished. By 1850, merely half of all residents caught while illegally collecting wood showed up to court, a fact unique to those convicted of illegally extracting wood. Another point of contention was the local's frequent use of the forest to rest their livestock. The guards put up fences and barricades but the locals would always break through them and let their livestock roam the forest. The tension over this topic became so bad that the guards threatened to shoot anyone caught of breaking the fences on the spot.

=== Government action ===
The head of the forest guard, Stenius, had requested that additional reinforcements be ordered to the region to relieve the guard, but the request would be ignored by the government. However, the local officials in Kalmar were willing to provide their aid upon hearing Stenius's situation. The officials in Kalmar granted Stenius and his guard permission to, search and confiscate all the illegally extracted wood that they could find in the local households. The ones caught with the wood in their residences would of course be convicted of their crimes. While being denied assistance from the military, an additional number of authority figures would be sent over to Öland to assist in the searches. The locals would be informed of the decisions made at church on the 10th of March by the priest Lindwall Abraham. He stated that:

"Och komma dessa rannsakningar att med all den kraft lag tillåter att verkställas, och allt virke som anträffas vartill ägaren icke kan visa laga åtkomst att genast såsom tjuv av mig häktas och åtalas... Ävensom jag varnar vederbörande skogstjuvar för att störa eller hindra de rannsakningar, som nu komma att dagligen fortlöpa"

— Lindwall Abraham

The announcement was deeply unpopular among the local residents and large groups of people stayed behind after church despite freezing temperatures to discuss the situation. Something which was especially a cause of irritation among the locals was the use of the word tjuv (thief) in the announcement. Many of the locals had used the forest for the extraction of wood for the better part of their lives and thus deemed the king's claims upon the land illegitimate. That night, the increased tensions between the authorities and the locals could already be felt as the locals pressured the guards for more information at Gerner's tavern.

During the early hours of the 11th of March 1850, an impressive force of authority figures organized by Henrik Eneman (the highest-ranking official in the area) had gathered at Melböda to inspect the houses of the locals. The first destination of the party was the Böda church as it was suspected that an illegal wood shop was operating nearby. Their suspicions turned out to be true and the merchant Fageren would immediately be detained. As the area lacked proper roads and Öland had seen heavy snowfall, the party made use of horses to traverse the terrain to the next destination. The party continued from farm to farm without incident until they reached Grankulla. The community seemed to be almost abandoned with only the elders remaining who refused to tell Eneman about the rest of the villager's whereabouts. Eneman decided to conduct the inspection regardless of the absence of the homeowners, and he and his men broke into a seemingly abandoned house. However, when inside, the party was faced by two frightened and screaming children. Eneman slapped both of them to get them to quiet down but was then faced by an enraged farm worker who had been tasked with protecting the children in the parent's absence. However, the farm worker was subdued by an additional slap by Eneman. Upon the eventual departure from Grankulla, the party was tauntingly warned of what was to come on their expedition.

== Rebellion ==
After their stay at Grankulla, the Eneman and his party headed towards Torp. As the roads to Torp did not suit a party bound on horseback, the decision was made to traverse the final stretch of road by foot. Around 2 kilometers from Torp, two boys were spotted hiding behind a tree, presumably as lookouts. Eneman attempts to call out to the two boys but he is left on deaf ears as the pair sprints off to Torp. A couple of minutes later, gunshots are heard from the village.

Upon reaching Torp, the party is met by a large cheering gathering at Pålssons farm, some were armed with rifles and Cudgels. After the cheering seized, the well-liked Sheriff Eriksson was the one to break the silence. Initially, it seemed as if tensions were de-escalating, but Eriksson would be interrupted by Eneman who precedes to loudly read out the royal order that permitted them to search their homes. The use of the word "Skogstjuvar" (English: Forest thieves) by Eneman greatly enraged the gathering which now became louder. Eneman then attempted to, by himself, force his way into the farm but faced resistance from the crowd including the homeowner Pålsson. Someone among the crowd then threw a stone at Eneman that came only within a few centimeters of his face. Soon the rest of the crowd started to bombard the officials with stones. Eneman and his company were left no other choice but to slowly retreat through the thick snow while the crowd at Pålsson's farm cheered and fired their rifles.

The islanders were in full control of Öland and were free to use the forest to their liking while Stenius refused to guard the forest without military assistance, however, the authorities were not keen on letting the locals have their way. Between the 3rd and 4 April, a hastily put-together force of 110 men makes their way across the ice between Sweden and Öland to restore order. Upon setting foot on the island, the force marches on Torp and swiftly occupies it, and while there they take prisoners and conduct searches of illegally acquired wood.

== Aftermath ==
A total of 18 people were put to court after the uprising, of whom, 9 would be sentenced. Simon Nilsson was the one most severely punished as he had been pointed out to be especially active in organizing the revolt, he was sentenced to 2 years of forced labor. Through the court hearings, the forest guard Adlerbjelke was found to have encouraged the locals to put up resistance and to have provided them with weapons. However, he would never be convicted as he was dead on the 14th of April with a self-inflicted gun wound in his mouth. He was later buried at the Böda church.

Emotional scenes occurred in Böda when the convicts left to serve their sentences. One soldier remarks of how fathers left their crying wives and children:

"Ett sådant elände har jag varken sett eller hört som när fångarna skulle föras från sina hustrur och barn och undergå sitt straff. Gråt och jämmer var det utan like när de skulle skiljas från varandra."

Many of the prisoners would never see their homes again as they would die while serving their sentence.

On the 150th anniversary of the uprising, a monument was raised on the very place the uprising started.

== See also ==
- Tullberg Uprising
