= Klågerup =

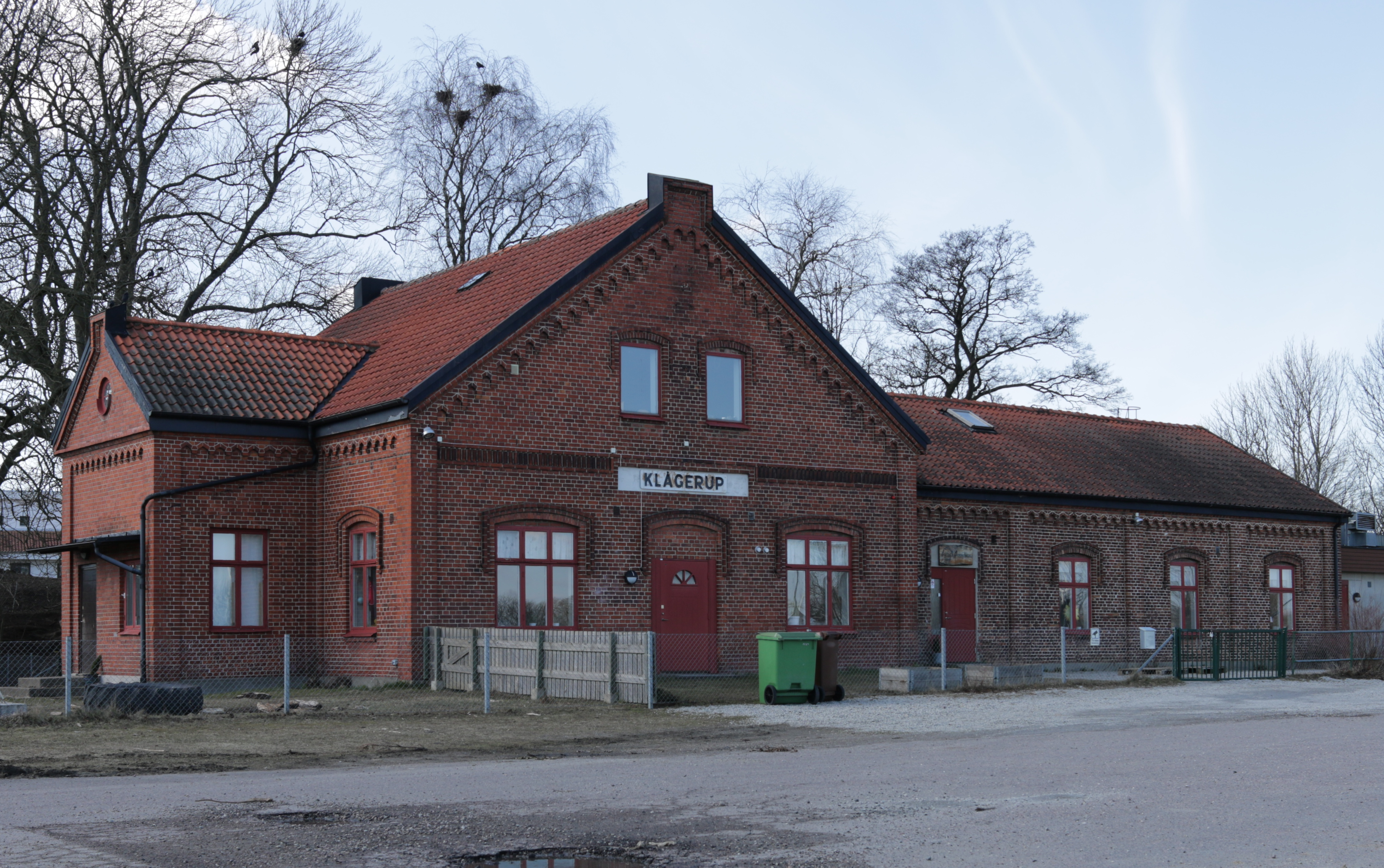
- Klågerup train station

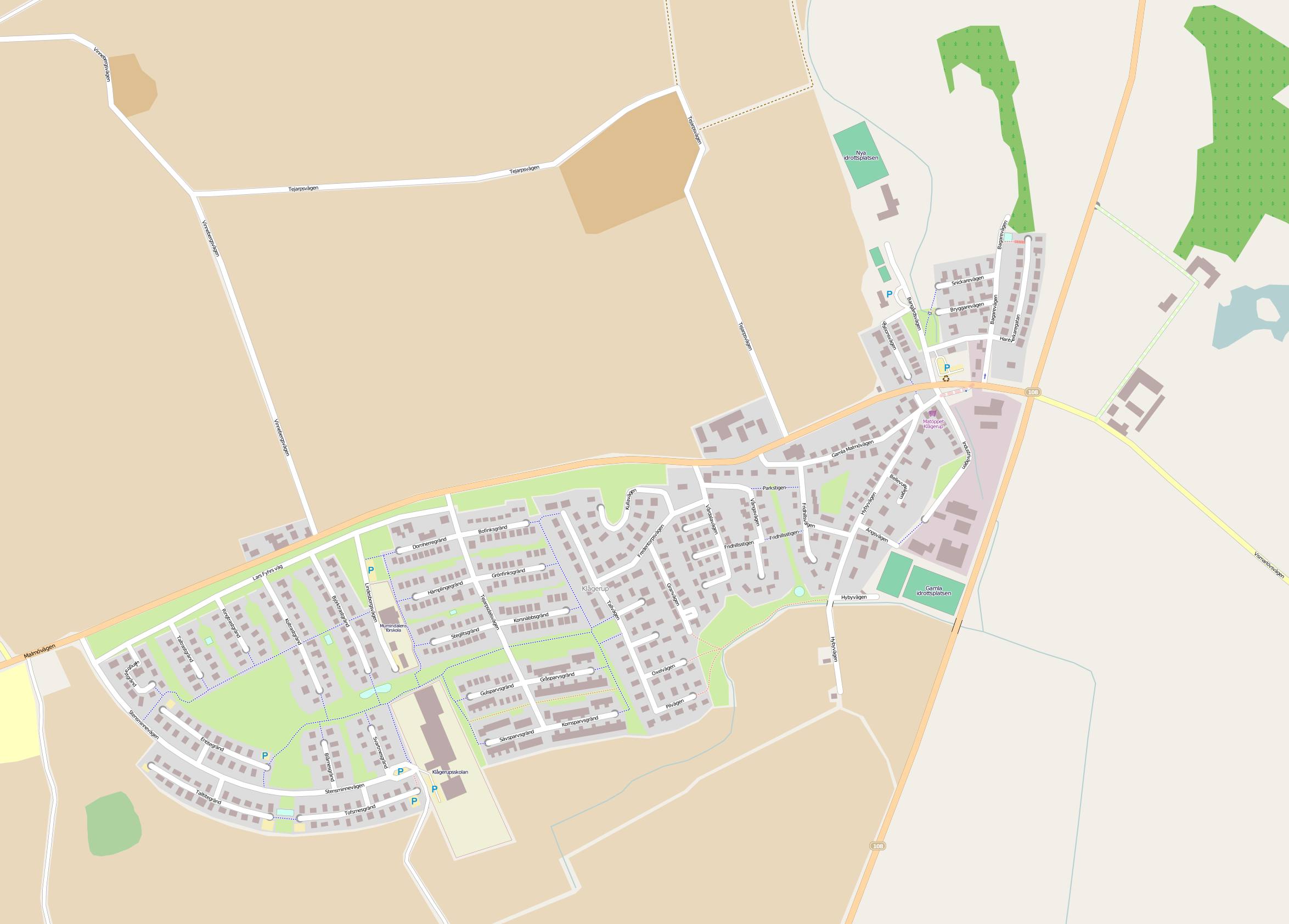
- Map of Klågerup from OpenStreetMap

- Location within Skåne Location within Sweden
- Coordinates: 55°36′N 13°15′E
- Country: Sweden
- Province: Skåne
- County: Skåne County
- Municipality: Svedala Municipality

Area
  - Total: 1.07 km^{2} (0.41 sq mi)

Population (31 December 2010)
  - Total: 1,904
  - Density: 1,781/km^{2} (4,610/sq mi)
- Time zone: UTC+1 (CET)
  - Summer (DST): UTC+2 (CEST)

Klågerup is a locality situated in Svedala Municipality, Skåne County, Sweden with 1,904 inhabitants in 2010. It is located next to road 108. This was the scene of the Klågerup Riots of 1811.

== Society ==
In Klågerup there is a school, two kindergartens, grocery store and a pizzeria. In the east part of Klågerup is a small industry area.

== History ==
In the beginning of the 19th century Europe was at war. For Sweden to show that they were a strong nation they decided to recruit more soldiers. In the spring of 1810 it was decided that every piece of land that hadn't supplied soldiers to the war was now going to supply soldiers. Students, government officials, regular citizens and similar groups in the society were exempt from being recruited. So the burden fell on the poor people that didn't own any land. They were angry about the new regulations.

In the spring of 1811 it was decided that 15,000 men were going to be recruited. In June 1811, 1.200 poor people gathered in Torup's courtyard. After that they went to Klågerup's courtyard. Major Hampus Mörner went with 150 men and two cannons to face the mob, about 800 of them stayed to fight. Mörner's troops tried to persuade them to leave but they wouldn't budge. The major then decided to attack; about 40 of the rebels were killed and 289 people were sent to Malmö.

In the end 395 people were accused, but only three were executed. That was the end of the Klågerup riots.

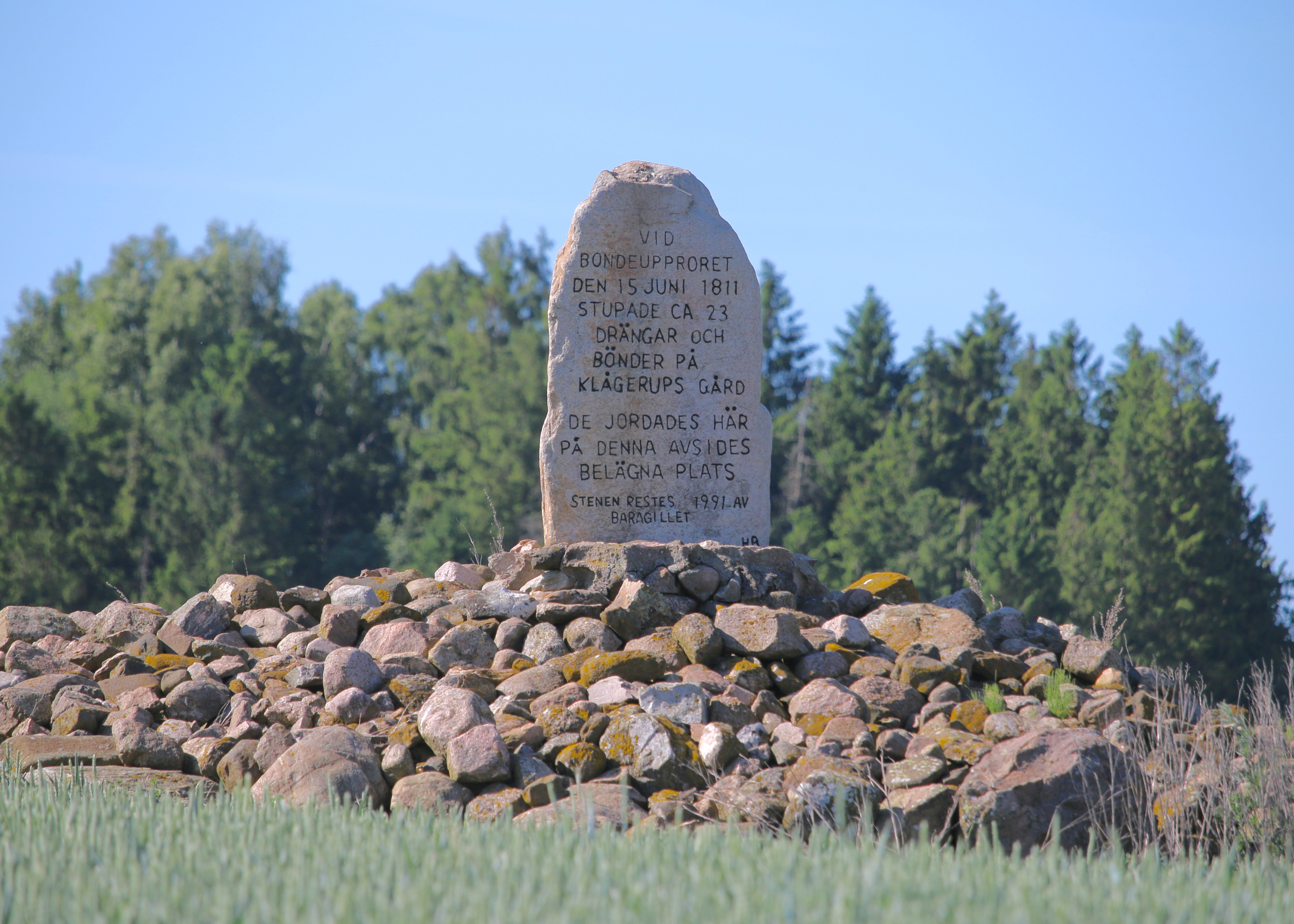
Memorial for those killed in the riots 1811
