= Siege of Stralsund (1807) =

1807 Siege during the Franco-Swedish War

- Part of the Franco-Swedish War
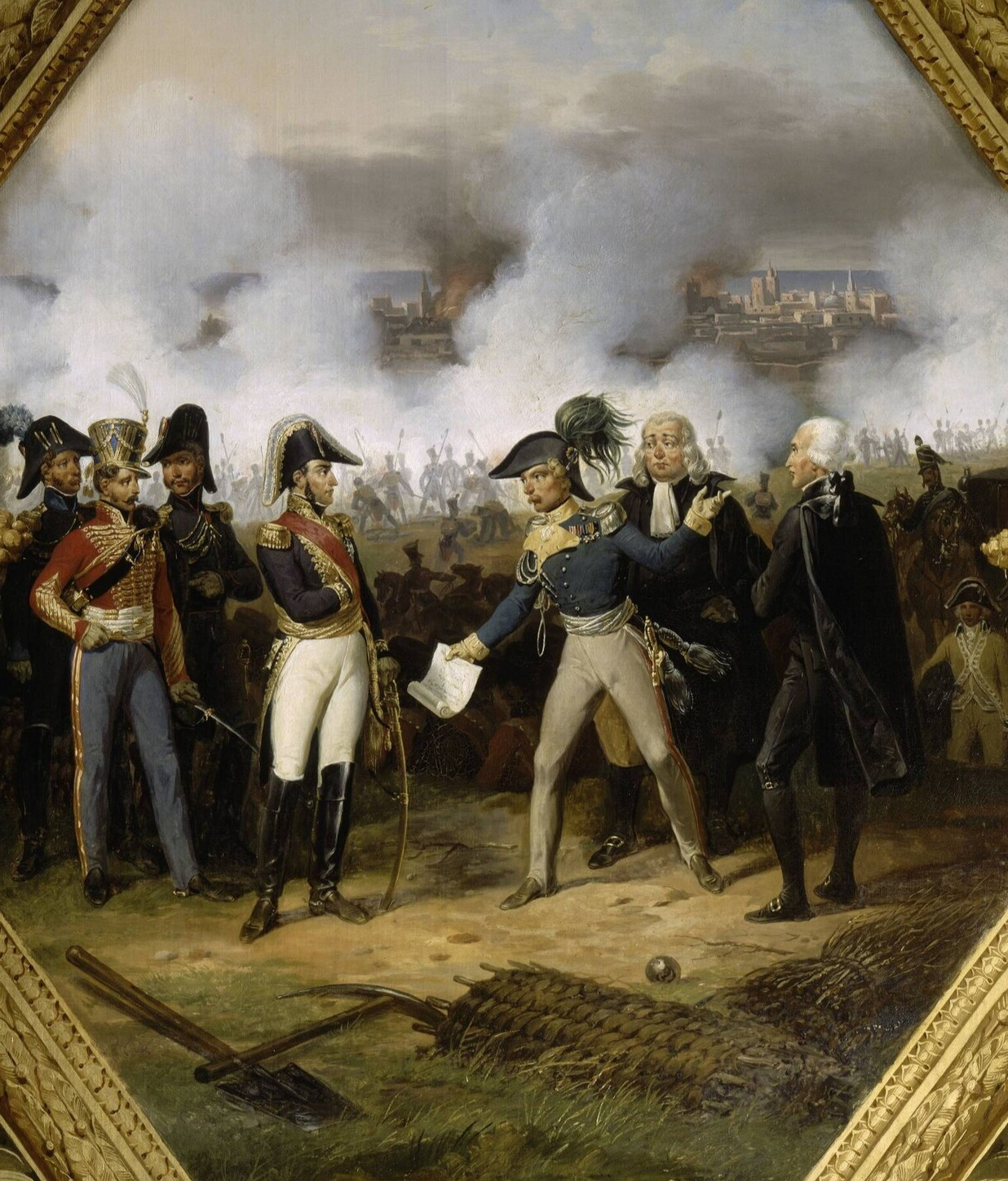
- Capture of Stralsund, 20 August 1807 by Hippolyte Lecomte and Jean Alaux, 1834
Date	24 July – 24 August 1807
Location	Stralsund, Swedish Pomerania
Result	French victory
Territorial changes	Sweden loses Swedish Pomerania

Belligerents
(First French Empire) French Empire; Spain (Netherlands) Kingdom of Holland; Kingdom of Italy	Sweden

Commanders and leaders
(First French Empire) Édouard Mortier (First French Empire) Guillaume Brune (Spain) Jean de Kindelan (Kingdom of Italy (Napoleonic)) Giuseppe Federico Palombini	(Sweden) Gustav IV Adolf (Sweden) Hans Henric von Essen

Strength
40,000	15,000; 500 guns

Casualties and losses
998 killed, wounded or captured	Unknown

The siege of Stralsund lasted from 24 July to 24 August, 1807, and saw troops from the First French Empire twice attempt to capture the port city from Lieutenant General Hans Henric von Essen's 15,000-man Swedish garrison. Early that year, Marshal Édouard Adolphe Casimir Joseph Mortier blockaded the city for two months before he was called elsewhere. In his absence, the Swedes drove back the inferior blockading force. After Mortier returned and pushed Essen's troops back in turn, the two sides quickly concluded an armistice. The truce was later repudiated by King Gustav IV Adolf of Sweden, and Marshal Guillaume Marie Anne Brune then led 40,000 French, German, Spanish, Italian and Dutch soldiers against the fortress. Fearfully outnumbered, the Swedes abandoned the Baltic Sea port of Stralsund to the Franco-Allies in the action during the War of the Fourth Coalition, part of the Napoleonic Wars. As a consequence, Sweden also lost the nearby island of Rügen.

== Prelude ==
Sweden was established in Stralsund since the Battle of Stralsund (1628), and in the rest of the Duchy of Pomerania since the Treaty of Stettin (1630). By the Peace of Westphalia (1648) and the Treaty of Stettin (1653), the duchy was partitioned into a Swedish part, including Stralsund, and a Brandenburg-Prussian part. After minor losses in the Treaty of Saint-Germain-en-Laye (1679), Swedish Pomerania was reduced to the area north of the Peene river with Greifswald, Stralsund and Rügen in the Treaty of Stockholm in 1720.

When Napoleon Bonaparte started to expand eastwards in the Napoleonic Wars, the Swedish Empire initially maintained a neutral stance. In 1805, Gustav IV Adolf of Sweden entered the War of the Third Coalition on the anti-French side, primarily to strip Napoleon's ally Denmark of Norway. His Norwegian ambitions were thwarted by several military and diplomatic setbacks.

== The blockade ==
Stralsund, a port in Swedish Pomerania, was defended by the Swedish governor Hans von Essen. On 28 January, French forces commanded by Marshal Mortier crossed the Peene River in an attempt to impose a blockade on Stralsund. To the east, General of Division Charles Louis Dieudonné Grandjean's division crossed the Peene at Anklam, driving back the Swedish outposts. To the west, General of Division Pierre Louis Dupas' division crossed the stream unopposed near Demmin. On the 29th, Mortier's two divisions appeared before the port and on 30 January began the blockade.

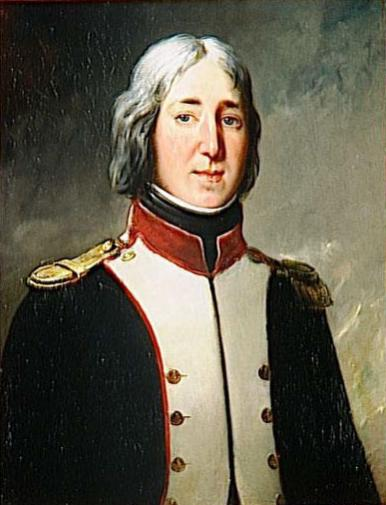
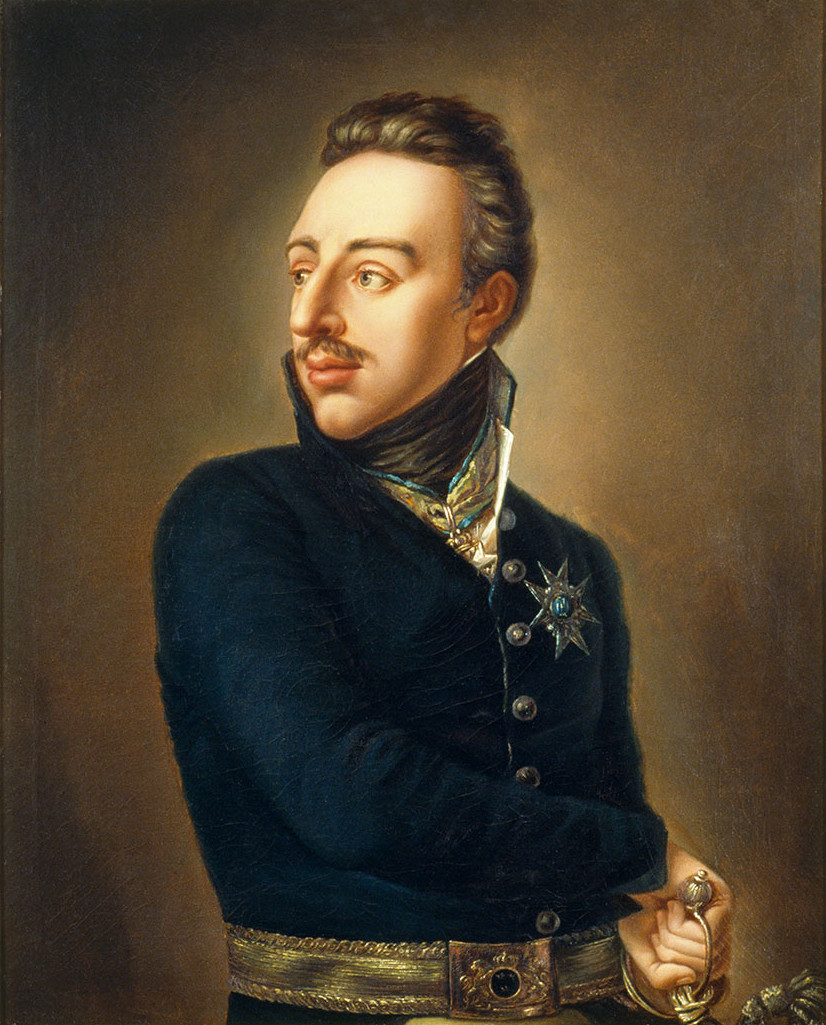
Édouard Mortier (left) and Gustav IV Adolf of Sweden (right)

For the next two months, the two sides fought a number of skirmishes as the French strengthened their lines of investment. Without control of the island of Rügen, the French were unable to interrupt Stralsund's sea communications and were harassed by Swedish gunboats. During the blockade, one French cavalry and three infantry regiments were taken from Mortier to fight against the Russians in Poland and replaced by troops from the Kingdom of Holland.

On 29 March, Mortier received orders to leave Grandjean's division to maintain the blockade and march to assist in the siege of Kolberg in Brandenburg-Prussian Pomerania. After Mortier left, Essen drove Grandjean's outnumbered troops from their lines. Grandjean fell back to Anklam where he was attacked again on 3 April and forced to retreat southeast to the fortress of Stettin on the Oder, arriving there on the 7th. Mortier retraced his steps and by 13 April had assembled 12,000 to 13,000 men at Stettin, about the same number as Essen. In very wet weather, Mortier began pressing Essen back to Anklam. On 16 April, Mortier defeated the Swedes in the Battle of Belling. The next day, Essen retreated to the north bank of the Peene.

Beginning on 18 April, the French and Swedish forces arranged the truce of Schlatkow. Anxious to employ Mortier's men against the Russians and Prussians, Napoleon had authorized the marshal to make a truce with the Swedes. For their part, the Swedes were upset that England had given them very little support. By the 29th, the terms were worked out. The Swedes were to stay on the north side of the Peene. They handed over the islands of Usedom and Wolin at the mouth of the Oder and promised not to help the Prussians at the sieges of Kolberg (Kolobrzeg) or Danzig.

== The siege ==
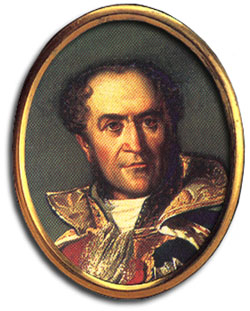
Guillaume Brune

King Gustav IV Adolf landed in Stralsund on 12 May, and denounced the truce on 3 July. By this time, the Treaties of Tilsit had just deprived Sweden of all her allies but Great Britain. King Gustav IV Adolf however viewed Napoleon as the "monster of the apocalypse" and was unwilling to compromise on his anti-French policies.

On 24 July, French Marshal Guillaume Brune attacked the Swedish positions on the Peene river and reoccupied the investing lines around Stralsund. Reinforced by troops from the failed siege of Kolberg, Brune massed a total of 40,000 men. His French troops included General of Division Jean Boudet's 7-battalion French infantry division of 7,773 infantry and 200 artillerymen and General of Division Gabriel Jean Joseph Molitor's 8-battalion French infantry division of 8,712 infantry and 205 gunners. The Dutch contingent had General of Division Jean-Baptiste Dumonceau's 11-battalion infantry division of 9,924 foot soldiers and 570 gunners, General of Division Henri Gatien Bertrand's 6-battalion infantry division of 3,932 infantry and 159 artillerymen, and General of Division Carteret's 5-squadron cavalry brigade of 1,112 troopers.

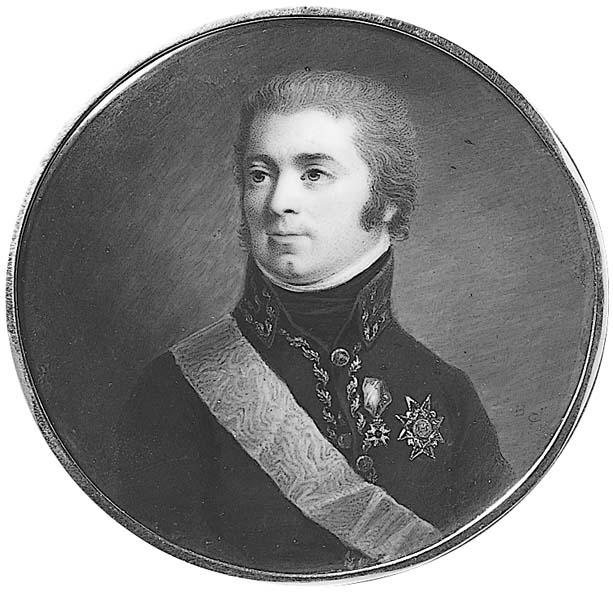
Hans Henric von Essen

Brune's Spanish allies included General Pedro Caro, 3rd Marquis of la Romana's 14 infantry battalions and 12 cavalry squadrons. This corps totalled 9,763 infantry, 2,340 cavalry, 324 gunners, and 104 sappers. General of Division Domenico Pino led a Kingdom of Italy division consisting of eight battalions, eight squadrons, two foot artillery batteries, and one horse artillery battery. The Grand Duchy of Baden contributed six battalions, one squadron, and one foot artillery battery. The small German states were represented by the Grand Duchy of Würzburg, two battalions, Duchy of Berg, two battalions, and Duchy of Nassau, three battalions.

The 15,000 Swedish defenders included three Finnish battalions, Pommeranian Landwehr garrison troops, one battalion of the King's Household Infantry Regiment and one battalion of the Engelbrechten Infantry Regiment. There were 500 cannons in the fortress. Subordinate to Essen were Lieutenant General Armfelt, General-Major Vegesack, and General-Major Peyron. Gustav IV Adolf left the town on 20 August. Deciding that resistance was useless, the Swedes spiked the cannon and burned the gun carriages. They evacuated the port and transported the powder and shot to Rügen. During the second siege, the Franco-Allies lost 38 officers and 960 soldiers killed, wounded, missing, or died of illness. Swedish losses are unknown. Stralsund and Rügen were surrendered to France in the course of an armistice. Stralsund was handed over to the French on 24 August and Rügen on 7 September 1807.

On 25 August, General of Brigade François Nicolas Fririon and naval Captain Peytes de Montcabrié attacked the fortified island of Dänholm near Rügen. The 1,200-man and two-gun force comprised one battalion of the 30th Line Infantry Regiment, artillery, sappers, pontonniers, miners, and sailors of the Imperial Guard. The successful operation cost the French 15 killed and 26 wounded. The 600 to 800 Swedish defenders lost between 26 and 125 men in dead and wounded, while between 300 and 517 were captured. Eight fortress guns and six field pieces also fell into French hands.

== Aftermath ==
After Sweden was driven out of northern Germany in 1807, she became subject to attacks from Denmark-Norway and the Russian Empire in 1808. Military mismanagement and lack of support led to Gustav IV Adolf being arrested on 13 March 1809 in the course of an insurrection. He was deposed in May and he and his family were expelled in December after Sweden lost a third of its realm in the Treaty of Fredrikshamn.

French occupation of Stralsund was temporarily interrupted when a Prussian freikorps under Ferdinand von Schill seized the city in May 1809, but after a few days it was recaptured in the Battle of Stralsund. When the Napoleonic Wars were concluded by the Congress of Vienna in 1815, Stralsund along with all of Swedish Pomerania became part of the Prussian Province of Pomerania.

== See also ==
- Pomerania during the Early Modern Age
- History of Pomerania (1806–1933)

== Sources ==
=== Bibliography ===
- Barton, H. Arnold (2008). Essays on Scandinavian History. Southern Illinois University Press. ISBN 978-0-8093-2886-4.
- Björlin, Gustaf (1882). Sveriges Krig i Tyskland åren 1805–1807. Stockholm: Militärlitteratur-Föreningens Förlag.
- Heitz, Gerhard; Rischer, Henning (1995). Geschichte in Daten. Mecklenburg-Vorpommern (in German). Münster-Berlin: Koehler&Amelang. ISBN 3-7338-0195-4.
- Jaques, Tony (2006). Dictionary of Battles And Sieges: A Guide to 8,500 Battles from Antiquity Through the Twenty-first Century. Greenwood Publishing Group. ISBN 0-313-33536-2.
- Langer, Herbert (2003). "Die Anfänge des Garnisionswesens in Pommern". In Asmus, Ivo; Droste, Heiko; Olesen, Jens E. (eds.). Gemeinsame Bekannte: Schweden und Deutschland in der Frühen Neuzeit (in German). Berlin-Hamburg-Münster: LIT Verlag. ISBN 3-8258-7150-9.
- Manso, Johann Kaspar Friedrich (1835). Geschichte des Preussischen Staates vom Frieden zu Hubertsburg bis zur zweiten Pariser Abkunft: Bd. 1797-1807 (in German). Vol. II (2 ed.). J. C. Hermann.
- Petre, F. Loraine. Napoleon's Campaign in Poland 1806-1807. London: Lionel Leventhal Ltd., 1976 (1907).
- Porter, Roy; Teich, Mikuláš (1988). Romanticism in national context. Cambridge University Press. ISBN 0-521-33913-8.
- Smith, Digby. The Napoleonic Wars Data Book. London: Greenhill Books, 1998. ISBN 1-85367-276-9
- Sturdy, David J. (2002). Fractured Europe, 1600-1721. Wiley-Blackwell. ISBN 0-631-20513-6.
- von Daniels, Alexander (1863). Handbuch der deutschen Reichs- und Staatenrechtsgeschichte (in German). Vol. III. Laupp.
- von Vegesack, Ernst (1840). Svenska arméens fälttåg uti Tyskland och Norrige åren 1805, 1806, 1807 och 1808 (in Swedish). Stockholm: L.J. Hjerta.

Preceded by Battle of Friedland	Napoleonic Wars; Siege of Stralsund (1807)	Succeeded by Battle of Copenhagen (1807)
