= Maria Nilsdotter i Ölmeskog =

Maria Nilsdotter i Ölmeskog (1756–1822) was a Swedish farmer in Väse Hundred in Värmland County, who was awarded a Royal Citizens Medal after having prevented a rebellion during the disturbances after the death of Charles August, Crown Prince of Sweden in May 1810.

Maria Nilsdotter was the daughter of the farmer Nils Larsson and Kierstin Nilsdotter i Ölmskog and married Jan Nilsson in 1781; she was the heir of her parents and took over the farm Ölmskog with her spouse from her parents.

After the death of Charles August, Crown Prince of Sweden on 28 My 1810, rumors circulated through the nation that he had been poisoned by the Gustavians, and created great tension. In the capital of Stockholm, Axel von Fersen the Younger was lynched in June because of these rumors (Fersen murder).

In Värmland, an anonymous proclamation circulated which called men to arm themselves and march as an army to the capital to protect the monarch, who was claimed to be in danger. By the time they reached the farm of Maria Nilsdotter, they were about 40, but still growing in numbers, and asked for her three sons and male servants to join them. She demanded to know who had issued the proclamation. When told that it was in fact not issued by the authorities but from an anonymous and unknown source, she forbid her sons to join them. She thereafter held a speech to the assembled armed men, which convinced them to dissolve the improvised army and discontinue the formatting of it. She thereby prevented what could have been the start of a dangerous rebellion.

On 8 October 1810, Maria Nilsdotter was awarded a chain with a medal of gold and a Gilding silver coup with the inscription: "By King Carl XIII to Goodwife Maria Nilsdotter i Ölmeskog, for virtue in citizenry".

== See also ==
- Klågerupskravallerna
