= Battle of the Nargö =

- Part of the Anglo-Russian War
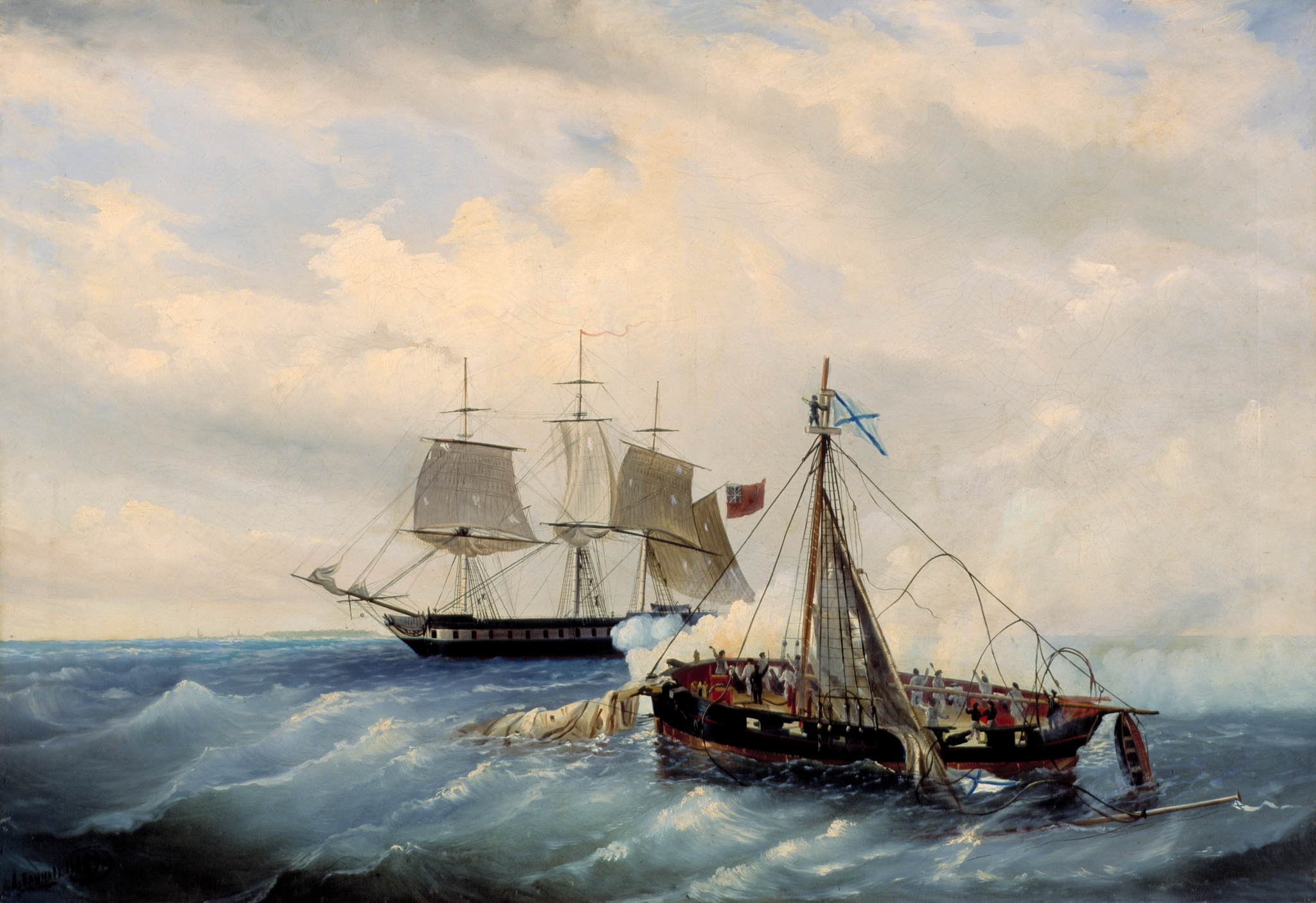
- Battle between the Russian ship Opyt and the British frigate HMS Salsette, off the coast of Nargen Island, 11th July 1808; Leonid Demyanovich Blinov, 1888
Date	23 June [O.S. 11 June] 1808
Location	Off Naissaar, Baltic Sea
Result	British victory

Belligerents
United Kingdom	Russia

Commanders and leaders
Walter Bathurst	Gabriel Nevelsky (POW)

Strength
1 frigate	1 cutter

Casualties and losses
Unknown	2 killed 11 wounded 1 cutter captured

The Battle of the Nargö (Битва у Наргена) was one of the few direct clashes during the Anglo-Russian War. The battle on 11 June 1808 between the Russian cutter Opyt and the British frigate HMS Salsette took place near the northern coast of Estonia by the island of Naissaar (Nargö) in the Baltic Sea, and ended in a British victory.

== Background ==
The Russian sailing and rowing boat had been launched in 1806. It was made of wood and held about 14- and 12-pounder guns. It had a crew of 53.

The British frigate, which was much better armed and had a crew of 400 people, fought against the Russian cruiser.

Speedboat Opyt had taken part in the siege of Sveaborg earlier in 1808, and it and the corvette Sharlotta patrolled the vicinity of Gangut, when they met a large number of Swedish ships, they avoided the battle, but Sharlotta was lost and Commander Nevelsky needed to find her.

== Battle ==
On 11 June 1808, near the Estonian coast, the Experience team saw a ship without distinguishing signs. Nevelsky thought it was Sharlotta and headed for her, but it turned out to be the British frigate HMS Salsette. The Russians realized the mistake and began to retreat under hail. Nevelsky wanted to break the ship aground, just not to give up. However, the ship had already been heavily damaged and it began to defend itself.

The battle lasted four hours and only after part of the team was seriously wounded, Nevelsky lost consciousness from blood loss, then the ship surrendered, but did not lower the flag. British commander admired the bravery of the Russians and refused to take a sword from the commander of the Russian boat, instead, as a sign of respect, he let the return to Russia. Russia lost 2 killed and 11 wounded in this battle.
