= Franco-Swedish War =

War between France and Sweden, 1805–1810

- Part of the Napoleonic Wars
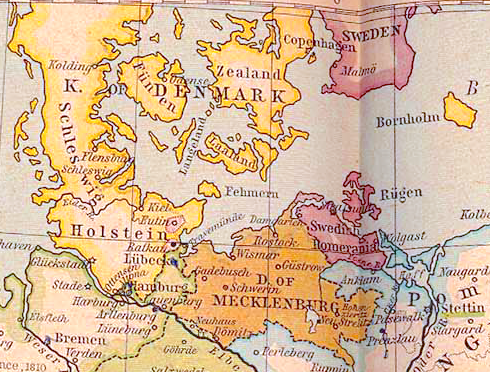
- Swedish Pomerania (centre-right) in 1812
Date	31 October 1805 – 6 January 1810 (4 years, 2 months and 6 days)
Location	Swedish Pomerania
Result	French victory
Territorial changes	Sweden regains Swedish Pomerania; Sweden integrates into the Continental System

Belligerents
(First French Empire) French Empire; Spain (until 1808); Holland; Co-belligerents: Russian Empire (1808–09); Denmark–Norway (1808–09)	Kingdom of Sweden; (United Kingdom of Great Britain and Ireland) United Kingdom; (Kingdom of Prussia) Prussia; Co-belligerents: Russian Empire (until 1807); Austrian Empire; Saxony

Commanders and leaders
(First French Empire) Guillaume Brune; (First French Empire) Édouard Mortier; (Spain) Pedro Caro; Louis Bonaparte; Jean Dumonceau	Gustav IV Adolf (until 29 March 1809); Charles XIII (after 6 June 1809); Hans von Essen; Johan Christopher Toll

Strength
1805: 13,000; 1810: 40,000	1805: 12,125; 1810: 27,000

Casualties and losses
Unknown	6,000 killed and captured
- [a] Gustav IV Adolf was deposed by a coup d'etat on March 9, 1809, and Charles XIII was appointed king in his place. [b] Until 1808

The Franco-Swedish War or Pomeranian War was the first involvement by Sweden in the Napoleonic Wars. The country joined the Third Coalition in an effort to defeat France under Napoleon Bonaparte.

== Background ==
In 1803, the United Kingdom had declared war on France, and Sweden remained neutral, together with Denmark–Norway and Prussia. However, after the execution of Louis-Antoine-Henri de Bourbon-Condé in 1804, the Swedish government broke all diplomatic ties with France and concluded a convention to allow the British to use Swedish Pomerania as a military base against France in exchange for payments. Russia also promised Sweden that 40,000 men would come to the aid of the country if it was threatened by French forces. Therefore, on 9 August 1805 Sweden joined the Third Coalition and declared war on France on 31 October.

== The war ==
=== Offensive against Hanover ===
In early November 1805, a combined British, Russian and Swedish force of about 12,000 men were sent from Swedish Pomerania to liberate French-held Hanover. The offensive against Hanover was repeatedly delayed because of Prussia's partial reluctance for the Swedes and the Russians to move troops through Prussian territory. However, in December 1805, after the Battle of Austerlitz, the British and the Russian forces started to evacuate Hanover and left only a small Swedish force alone to face the French. In April 1806, the Swedes were also forced to retreat to Swedish Pomerania after an agreement had been concluded between Prussia and France.

=== Fourth Coalition ===
However, during the summer of 1806 Prussia formed the Fourth Coalition against France, which gave Sweden the right to occupy Saxe-Lauenburg. In the autumn, the French forces advanced rapidly and soon much of the western German regions were occupied, which forced the Swedish troops on a retreat towards Lübeck. The plan was for the troops from there to take the sea route to Stralsund to avoid the advancing French forces. The Swedes were still caught by the French on 6 November while they loaded their ships at Lübeck, and after the Battle of Lübeck, about 1,000 Swedish soldiers had to surrender to the numerically-superior French forces.

The French Army began its offensive towards Swedish Pomerania in early 1807 and besieged Stralsund on 15 January. That began a seven-month siege, and since the French forces were engaged in warfare elsewhere as well, the number of troops stationed around Stralsund was gradually reduced. When the Swedes were reinforced on 1 April, a decision was made to attempt to break the siege. That was done with some success since the Swedes managed to take Usedom and Wolin, but the French chose to counterattack, and a force of 13,000 men attacked the Swedes from Stettin on 16 April and forced the left section of the Swedish army to withdraw. Another division in Ueckermünde was then cut off and later captured. On 18 April, France and Sweden agreed on a ceasefire according to which the French were to leave Pomerania. However, the Swedish government refused to join the Continental System and denounced the armistice under the influence of British diplomacy on 8 July.

On 6 August 1807, 50,000 French, Spanish and Dutch troops under Marshal Guillaume-Marie-Anne Brune began an assault on Swedish Pomerania and besieged Stralsund again. On 20 August 1807, the defenders of the city capitulated and the remains of the Swedish Army were surrounded at Rügen. However, Swedish General Johan Christopher Toll managed to conclude the Convention of Schlatkow with Marshal Brune on favourable terms, and his forces withdrew to Sweden, along with all of their war munitions, on 7 September.

=== Treaty of Tilsit ===
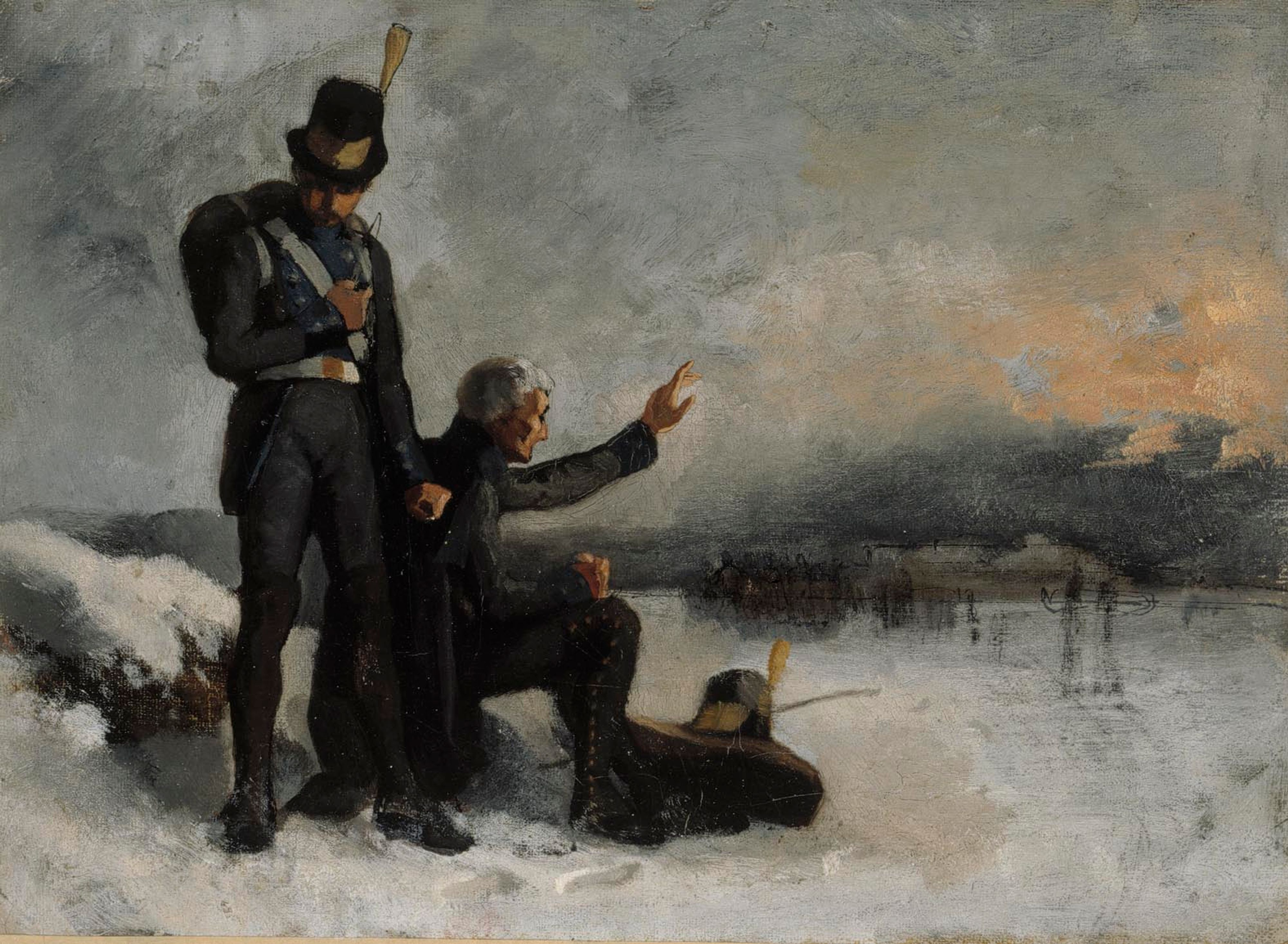
Scene from the Finnish War, painted by Albert Edelfelt

The Franco-Russian Treaty of Tilsit left Britain and Sweden without other allies in the war against France. On 21 February 1808, Russia joined the war against Sweden by invading Finland and on 14 March the same year, Denmark-Norway also declared war on Sweden. Danish, French and Spanish troops began preparations for an invasion of Skåne in Sweden, but the plan was soon aborted, and the war was instead directed to the Norwegian-Swedish border. Sir John Moore's expedition, sent by the British government to protect Sweden from possible French-Danish attack, arrived on 3 May 1808 and stayed until July, when it was redirected to Portugal.

Napoleon's plans to invade Sweden were never executed because of the British activity on the Baltic Sea, the weakness of the Danish military and the hesitations of French Marshal Bernadotte, whose actions made him popular enough to be elected as a Swedish Crown Prince after the coup d'etat in March 1809. On 30 August 1809, the new Swedish government was to conclude the Treaty of Fredrikshamn with Russia, which legitimised the Russian annexation of Finland and Åland. A peace treaty between Sweden and Denmark-Norway was signed with no territorial adjustments on 10 December 1809.

== Aftermath ==
On 6 January 1810, Sweden signed a Russian-mediated Treaty of Paris with France, regaining Pomerania at a cost of joining the Continental System. On 17 November 1810, Sweden was forced to declare war on Britain, and all British goods in Swedish Pomerania were seized. The government-supported smuggling continued, however, over the North Sea, and the Royal Navy was informed that it would be a phantom war. The war lasted until 1812, but no military action was taken.

== See also ==
- English Wars (Scandinavia)
  - Gunboat War
  - Dano-Swedish War of 1808-1809
- Finnish War
