= Anglo-Swedish war of 1810–1812 =

Theoretical state of war between Sweden and UK in Napoleonic times

The Anglo-Swedish War of 1810–1812
- Part of the Napoleonic Wars
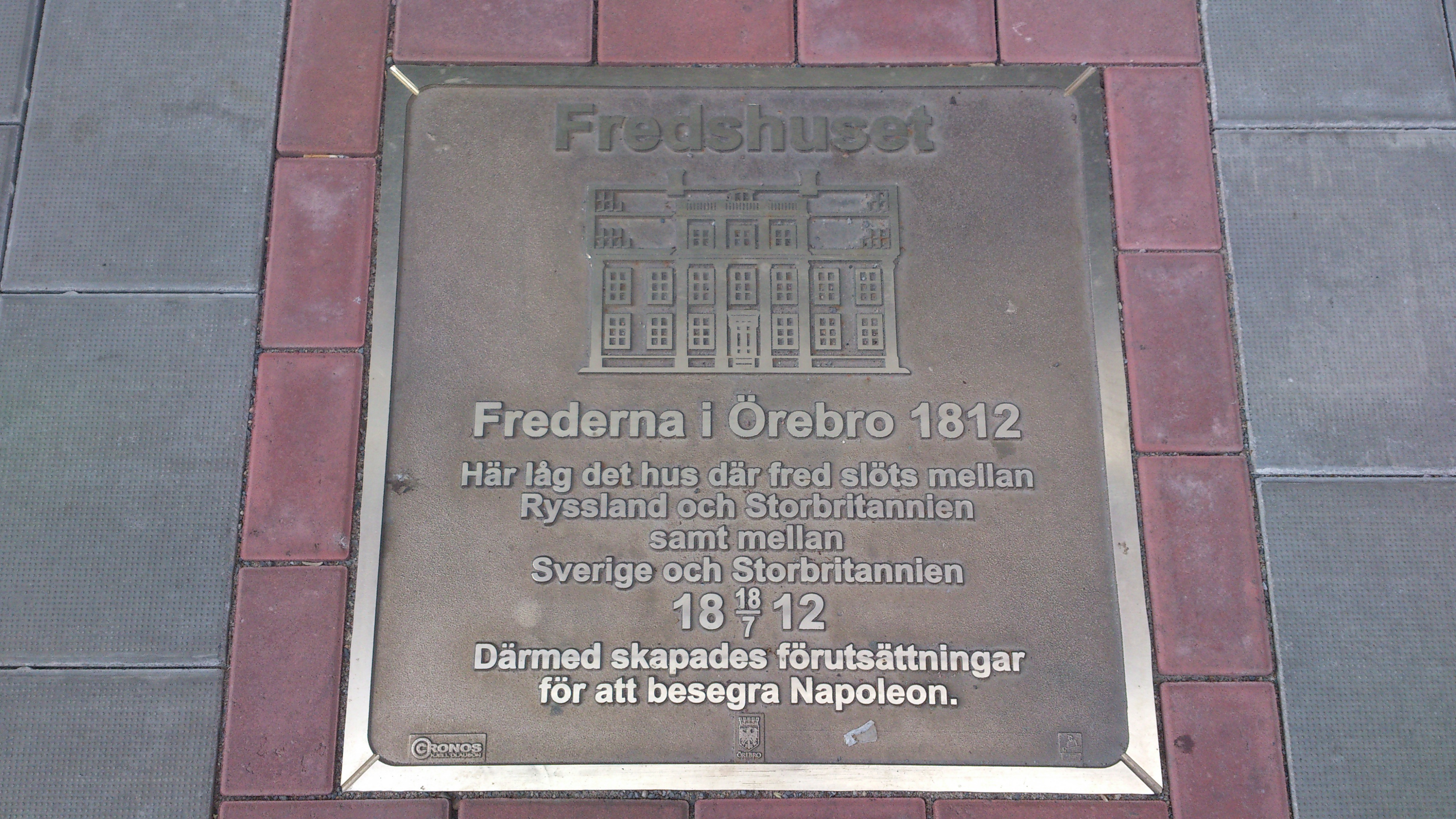
- Memorial plate to the Treaty of Örebro
Date	17 November 1810 – 18 July 1812 (1 year, 8 months and 1 day)
Location	N/A
Result	Treaty of Örebro
Territorial changes	Status quo ante bellum

Belligerents
(United Kingdom of Great Britain and Ireland) United Kingdom	Sweden

During the Napoleonic Wars until 1810, Sweden and the United Kingdom of Great Britain and Ireland were allies in the war against Napoleon. As a result of Sweden's defeat in the Finnish War and the Pomeranian War, and the following Treaty of Fredrikshamn and Treaty of Paris, Sweden declared war on the UK. The bloodless war, however, existed only on paper, and the UK was still not hindered in stationing ships at the Swedish island of Hanö and trade with the Baltic states.

== Background ==
The Treaty of Paris, concluded on 6 January 1810, forced Sweden to join the Continental System, a trade embargo against the UK. Since the UK was Sweden's biggest trade partner this caused economic difficulties, and trade continued to take place through smuggling. On 13 November that year, France delivered an ultimatum to the Swedish government demanding that within five days Sweden:

- Declare war against the UK,
- Confiscate all UK ships in Swedish ports,
- Seize all UK products in Sweden.

France and its allies threatened to declare war against Sweden if it did not meet the French demands. On 17 November the same year, the Swedish government declared war against the UK.

== War ==
No acts of war occurred during the conflict and the UK was even allowed to station boats in Hanö, thus "occupying" the island. Sweden did not try to hinder this as the UK used the island to continue trading with Sweden.

== Aftermath ==
The elected crown prince of Sweden, Danish Prince Charles August, had died on 28 May 1810, and on 21 August 1810, the French Marshal Jean-Baptiste Bernadotte was elected crown prince of Sweden. Although Bernadotte was only the crown prince and technically subservient to King Charles XIII, the king's deteriorating health and disinterest made the crown prince the de facto ruler of Sweden. Under Bernadotte's rule, Sweden's relationship with Napoleonic France deteriorated. When France occupied Swedish Pomerania and the island of Rügen in 1812, Sweden sought peace with the UK.

After long negotiations, the Treaty of Örebro was signed on 18 July 1812. On the same day and at the same place, the UK and Russia signed a peace treaty to end the Anglo–Russian War (1807–1812).

== See also ==
- English Wars (Scandinavia)
  - Gunboat War
- Dano-Swedish War of 1808–1809
- Pomeranian War
- Finnish War
