= Anglo-Russian War (1807–1812) =

War between the United Kingdom and Russian Empire

- Part of the Napoleonic Wars
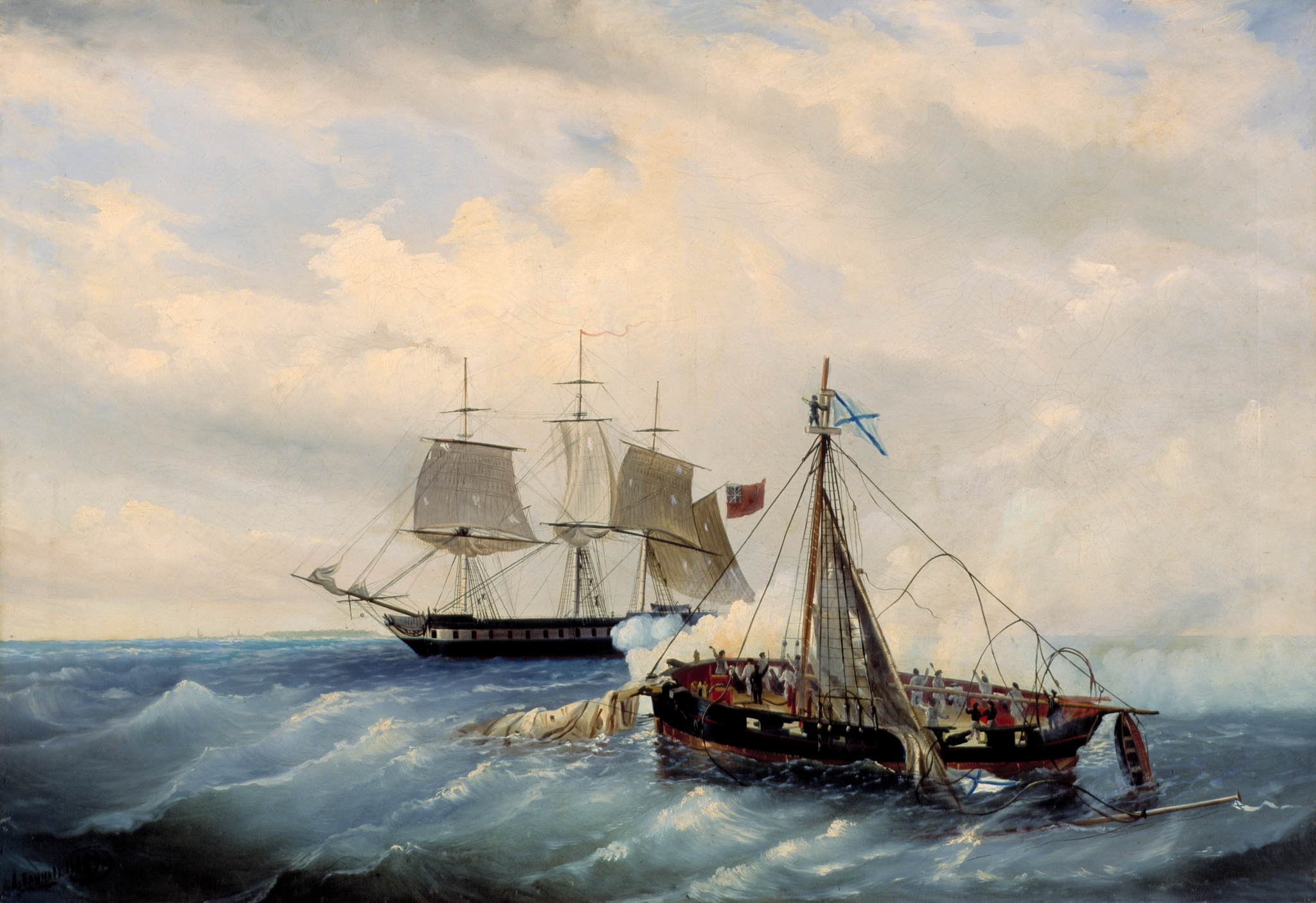
- Battle between the Russian ship Opyt and the British frigate HMS Salsette, off the coast of Nargen Island, 11th July 1808; Leonid Demyanovich Blinov, 1888
Date	2 September 1807 – 18 July 1812 (4 years 10 months & 16 days)
Location	Baltic Sea; Barents Sea
Result	Treaties of Örebro

Belligerents
(Russian Empire) Russia	(United Kingdom of Great Britain and Ireland) United Kingdom

Commanders and leaders
(Russian Empire) Alexander I (Russian Empire) Nikolay Rumyantsev (Russian Empire) Nikolai Saltykov	(United Kingdom of Great Britain and Ireland) George III (United Kingdom of Great Britain and Ireland) William Cavendish-Bentinck (United Kingdom of Great Britain and Ireland) Spencer Perceval (United Kingdom of Great Britain and Ireland) Robert Jenkinson

The Anglo-Russian War (2 September 1807 – 18 July 1812) was fought between the United Kingdom and the Russian Empire during the Napoleonic Wars. It began after Russia signed the Treaty of Tilsit with the First French Empire, which ended hostilities between the two nations. During the war, actual military engagements were limited primarily to minor naval actions in the Baltic Sea and Barents Sea.

== Treaty of Tilsit ==
After Napoleon Bonaparte defeated the Russians at the Battle of Friedland (14 June 1807), Tsar Alexander I of Russia signed a peace treaty, known as the Treaty of Tilsit. Although the treaty was quite unpopular within the Russian court, Russia had no alternative as Napoleon could easily cross the Neman river (then the Russian border) and invade Russia.

The terms of the treaty obliged Russia to cease her maritime trade with Great Britain. This closure was a part of Napoleon's continuing efforts to establish the Continental System, strengthening economic ties between the different countries in Europe under French domination. Napoleon's objective was to close one of Britain's most important markets and thus force it economically into submission.

== Military activities ==
On 26 October 1807, Emperor of all the Russias Alexander formally declared war on the United Kingdom after the British attack on Copenhagen in September 1807. He did not actively prosecute the war; Alexander instead restricted Russia's contribution to the bare requirement to close off trade. The British, understanding his position, limited their military response to the declaration. However, there were a few notable incidents.

=== Detention of Russian vessels ===
The official news did not arrive in Britain until 2 December, at which point the British authorities declared an embargo on all Russian vessels in British-controlled ports. The crews of approximately 70 British ships profited from the seizure of the 44-gun Russian frigate Speshnoy, which was lying at anchor in Portsmouth Harbour. The Russian storeship Wilhelmina was also seized at the same time. Speshnoy had sailed from Kronstadt with the payroll for Vice-Admiral Dmitry Senyavin’s squadron in the Mediterranean, together with Vilgemina. Vilgemina was slower but caught up with Speshnoy at Portsmouth. A portion of their cargo found on board consisted of 601,167 Spanish doubloons and 140,197 Dutch ducats. Consequently, an able seaman on any one of the 70 British vessels in the harbour received 14 shillings and 7 1/2 pence in prize money.

=== Lisbon Incident ===
In August 1807, Senyavin was ordered to bring his fleet from the Mediterranean to the Baltic, where the Finnish War with Sweden was already brewing. He set sail from Corfu on 19 September and although he planned to proceed directly to Saint Petersburg, stormy weather forced him to take refuge in the Tagus river and cast anchor in Lisbon on 30 October. With a French army approaching the city, Prince Regent John VI of Portugal had fled to the Portuguese colony of Brazil and the Royal Navy blockaded Lisbon, intercepting a Russian sloop as an enemy vessel because the Anglo-Russian War had been declared. In November, the French forces under the General Jean-Andoche Junot overran Lisbon.

Senyavin, placed in a delicate diplomatic position, proceeded to distinguish himself as a diplomat. He declared himself neutral and managed to protect his ships from seizure. In August 1808, British forces under the command of Arthur Wellesley defeated the French army at Vimeiro, expelling them from Portugal. Senyavin's squadron of seven ships of the line and one frigate were left face to face with fifteen British ships of the line and ten frigates. Senyavin maintained his neutrality, threatening to blow up his ships and destroy Lisbon in the case of an attack made against his squadron. Eventually, he signed a convention with Admiral Sir Charles Cotton, whereby the Royal Navy would escort his squadron to London, with the Russians still flying their flags. Moreover, Senyavin was to assume supreme command of the joint Anglo-Russian fleet, as he was higher in rank than Cotton. Two ships of Senyavin's squadron, Rafail and Yaroslav, were left in Lisbon due to needing repairs.

Senyavin's squadron embarked from Portugal for Portsmouth on 31 August 1808. On 27 September, it arrived at Portsmouth Harbour, and the British Admiralty was informed that the Russians had arrived with their flags streaming, as if in times of peace. The Lord Mayor of London, Charles Flower, argued that the convention was "disreputable for Britain's prestige", which many in the Admiralty agreed with. Senyavin's squadron was therefore detained in Portsmouth under various pretexts until winter, when the weather made their return to the Baltic impossible. The authorities in Portsmouth insisted that unless Senyavin's squadron sailed to Arkhangelsk, they would be intercepted by the Swedish Navy. In 1809, the departure of the squadron was further delayed by the disastrous Walcheren Expedition. At long last, on 5 August, Senyavin's squadron was allowed to leave Portsmouth for Riga, arriving there on 9 September 1809.

=== Naval conflict in the Baltic ===
Russia also invaded Sweden, a close ally of Britain, in 1808. But it was unlikely related to Britain and the Treaty, as the two countries already were at odds at the time. The Royal Navy supported the Swedish navy during the Finnish War and scored victories over the Russians in the Gulf of Finland in July 1808 and August 1809. In May 1808, the British sent a fleet under Vice-Admiral Sir James Saumarez to the Baltic. The British 44-gun frigate HMS Salsette captured the Russian cutter Opyt on 23 June [O.S. 11 June] 1808, after her captain and crew put up a determined resistance. The action took place off Nargen island (now Naissaar), which defends Reval from the sea. The Admiralty took Opyt into service as HMS Baltic.

==== Centaur and Implacable vs. Vsevolod ====
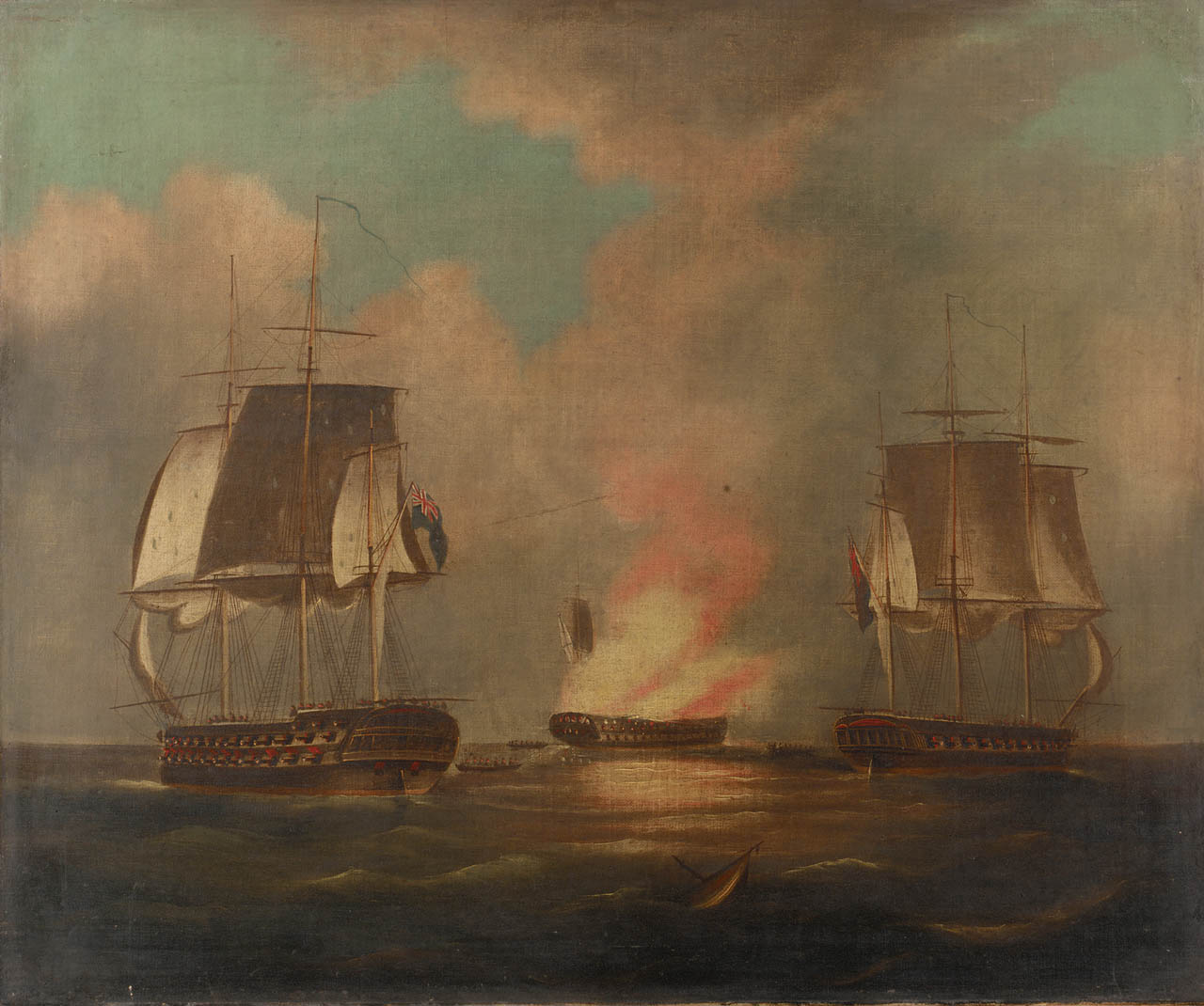
Centaur and Implacable watching as Vsevolod burns on 26 August 1808

On 9 July, the Russian fleet, under Admiral Pyotr Khanykov, came out from Kronstadt. The Swedes massed a fleet under Admiral Rudolf Cederström, consisting of 11 line-of-battle ships and 5 frigates at Örö and Jungfrusund to oppose them. On 16 August, Saumarez then sent 74-guns Centaur and Implacable to join the Swedish fleet. They chased two Russian frigates on the 19th and joined the Swedes the following day.

On 22 August, the Russian fleet, consisting of nine ships of the line, five large frigates and six smaller ones, moved from Hanko to threaten the Swedes. The Swedes, with the two British ships, grouped at Örö, and three days later sailed to meet the Russians.

The Russians and the Anglo-Swedish force were fairly evenly matched, but the Russians retreated and the Allied ships followed them. Centaur and Implacable were better vessels than the Swedish ships and slowly pulled ahead, with Implacable catching up with a Russian straggler, the 74-gun Vsevolod under Captain Daniil Rudnev. Eventually, and after heavy casualties, Vsevolod struck her colours. In 1847, the British Admiralty awarded the Naval General Service Medal with clasps "Implacable 26 Augt. 1808" and "Centaur 26 Augt. 1808" to surviving claimants (41 per vessel) from the action.

Saumarez's squadron joined the Anglo-Swedish squadron the next day. They then blockaded Khanykov's squadron for some months. After the British and Swedish warships abandoned their blockade, the Russian fleet was able to return to Kronstadt.

==== Boat actions ====
On 7 and 8 July 1809, the boats of Prometheus, Implacable, Bellerophon and Melpomene captured or destroyed several Russian gunboats and a convoy off Hanko Peninsula in the Baltic. Among the captured vessels were Russian gun boats No.5, No.10, No. 13, and No.15. In 1847 the Admiralty issued the Naval General Service Medal with clasp "7 July Boat Service 1809" to 33 surviving claimants from the action.

On 10 July, 18 Russian boats attacked the English ship at Pitcamp and it was forced to retreat hastily. 19 British boats attacked several russian boats 3 days later, and the Russians lost 3 boats in this battle.

Then on 25 July seventeen boats from a British squadron consisting of Princess Caroline, Minotaur, Cerberus and Prometheus, attacked a flotilla of four Russian gunboats and a brig off Aspö Head near Fredrikshamn in Old Finland, then part of Russian Empire. Captain Forrest of Prometheus commanded the boats and succeeded in capturing gunboats Nos. 62, 65, and 66, and the transport brig No. 11. The action was sanguinary in that the British lost 19 men killed and 51 wounded, and the Russians lost 28 men killed and 59 wounded. In 1847 the Admiralty issued the Naval General Service Medal with clasp "25 July Boat Service 1809" to 35 surviving claimants from the action.

However the successes of the Russian army on land forced Sweden to sign a peace treaty with Russia in 1809 whereby, inter alia, Sweden ceded the later Grand Duchy of Finland to Russia. Sweden sued for peace with France in 1810 and then formally joined the blockade against Britain as required by the Continental System, although in practice did little to enforce it. Sweden kept trading with Britain and the Royal Navy kept using Swedish ports.

=== Naval raids in the Barents Sea ===
In time, the Anglo-Russian War overlapped with the Gunboat War against Denmark-Norway, leading the British to expand their trade embargo to Russian waters and to forays by the British navy northwards into the Barents Sea. The navy conducted raids on Hasvik and Hammerfest and disrupted the Pomor trade, the Norwegian trade with Russia.

In June 1809 HMS Nyaden participated in one or two actions. First, her boats conducted a night raid on Kildin Island that neutralised a Russian garrison there. Boats from Nyaden also captured some 22–23 coastal trading vessels in the Kola River, many upriver from the present city of Murmansk. Nyaden also took several other Russian vessels at sea as prizes.

Nyaden was probably the vessel whose boats in July took possession of Catherine Harbour, in the ostrog, or fortified settlement, of Kola. The British also commandeered all the stores belonging to the White Sea Company (est. 1803 at Arkhangelsk). The Times reported that this was the first British engagement in Russian territory, news of the actions on Kildin Island either being subsumed or overlooked.

British naval involvement in the region continued into 1811. On 3 August 1810, the brig Gallant captured the St. Peder. Next year, on 2 January, Gallant captured the Danish privateer Restorateur off the Norwegian coast. Restorateur was armed with six 12-pounder guns and had a crew of 19 men. Four months later, on 5 April, Gallant captured the Victoria. Then on 1 August 1811, the frigate Alexandria, which was operating out of the Lieth station, captured the Russian vessels Michael, Ivan Isasima, and St. Oluff, and their cargoes.

=== Persia ===
During the Russo-Persian War, several British officers, who were part of Sir John Malcolm's 1809 embassy to Persia, remained in Persia and provided training to the reforming Persian army. One of the officers, William Monteith, accompanied Abbas Mirza on his unsuccessful campaign in Georgia and then commanded a frontier force and the garrison of Erivan.

== Outcome ==
Alexander I kept Russia as neutral as possible in the ongoing French war with Britain. He allowed Russians to continue secretly to trade with Britain and did not enforce the blockade required by Continental System. In 1810, he withdrew Russia from the Continental System and trade between Britain and Russia grew.

Franco-Russian relations became progressively worse after 1810. By 1811, it became clear that Napoleon was not keeping to his side of the terms of the Treaty of Tilsit. He had promised assistance to Russia in its war against the Ottoman Empire, but as the campaign went on, France offered no support at all.

With war imminent between France and Russia, Alexander started to prepare the ground diplomatically. In April 1812 Russia and Sweden signed an agreement for mutual defence. A month later Alexander secured his southern flank by the Treaty of Bucharest (1812), which formally ended the war against Turkey.

After Napoleon invaded Russia in June, the British and the Russians signed one Treaty of Örebro on 18 July 1812; on that same day and in the same place the British and Swedes signed another Treaty of Örebro ending the Anglo-Swedish War (1810–1812), a war that had had no engagements and no casualties.

== Sources ==
- Chapman, Tim (2001), Imperial Russia, 1801–1905 (illustrated, reprint ed.), Routledge, p. 29, ISBN 978-0-415-23110-7
- Chichester, Henry Manners (1894). "Monteith, William" . In Lee, Sidney (ed.). Dictionary of National Biography. Vol. 38. London: Smith, Elder & Co. pp. 280–281.
- Clarke, James Stanier; Jones, Stephen (1808), The Naval chronicle 1808 (January–June), Containing a general and biographical history of the royal navy of the United kingdom with a variety of original papers on nautical subjects ([1799–1818]), vol. 19, London: J. Gold, p. 129
- Nolan, Cathal J. (2002), The Greenwood Encyclopedia of International Relations: S-Z, The Greenwood Encyclopedia of International Relations, Cathal, vol. 4 (illustrated ed.), Greenwood Publishing Group, p. 1666, ISBN 978-0-313-32383-6
- Norie, John William (1827), The naval gazetteer, biographer, and chronologist; containing a history of the late wars, from their commencement in 1793 to their final conclusion in 1815; and continued, as to the biographical part, to the present time, ^{j. w. Noire & Co}, p. 560
- Tredrea, John; Sozaev, Eduard (2010), Russian Warships in the Age of Sail, 1696–1860, Seaforth, ISBN 978-1-84832-058-1
