= Skibsted =

Skibsted is a surname. Notable people with the surname include:

- Jens Martin Skibsted (born 1970), Danish designer, entrepreneur and author
- Peter Nicolay Skibsted (1787–1832), Danish naval officer
- Poul Skibsted (1753–1812), Danish Supreme Court attorney

== See also ==
- Schibsted (name)
