= Løvstræde 14 =

Building in Copenhagen, Denmark

Gråbrødretorv 2
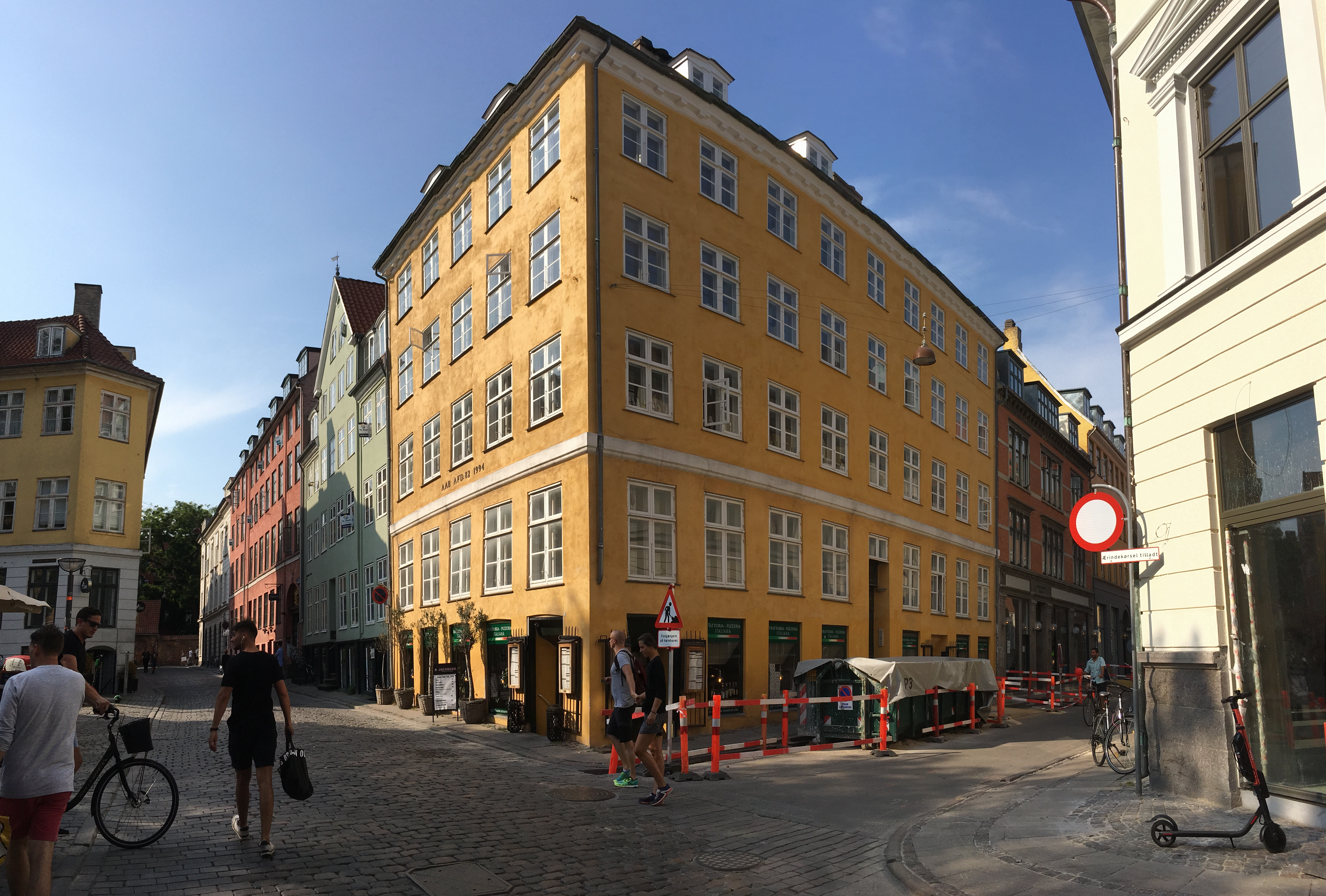
- Interactive map of the Gråbrødretorv 2 area

General information
- Architectural style: Neoclassical
- Location: Copenhagen, Denmark
- Coordinates: 55°40′48.47″N 12°34′35.58″E
- Completed: c. 1730

Løvstræde 14 is a Neoclassical property situated at the corner of Gråbrødretorv (No. 2) and Løvstræde (No. 14) in the Old Town of Copenhagen, Denmark. It originates in a three-storey corner building from around 1730 but owes its current appearance to an 1832 renovation and extension along Løvstræde. The entire complex was listed in the Danish registry of protected buildings and places in 1950.

== History ==
=== 18th century ===
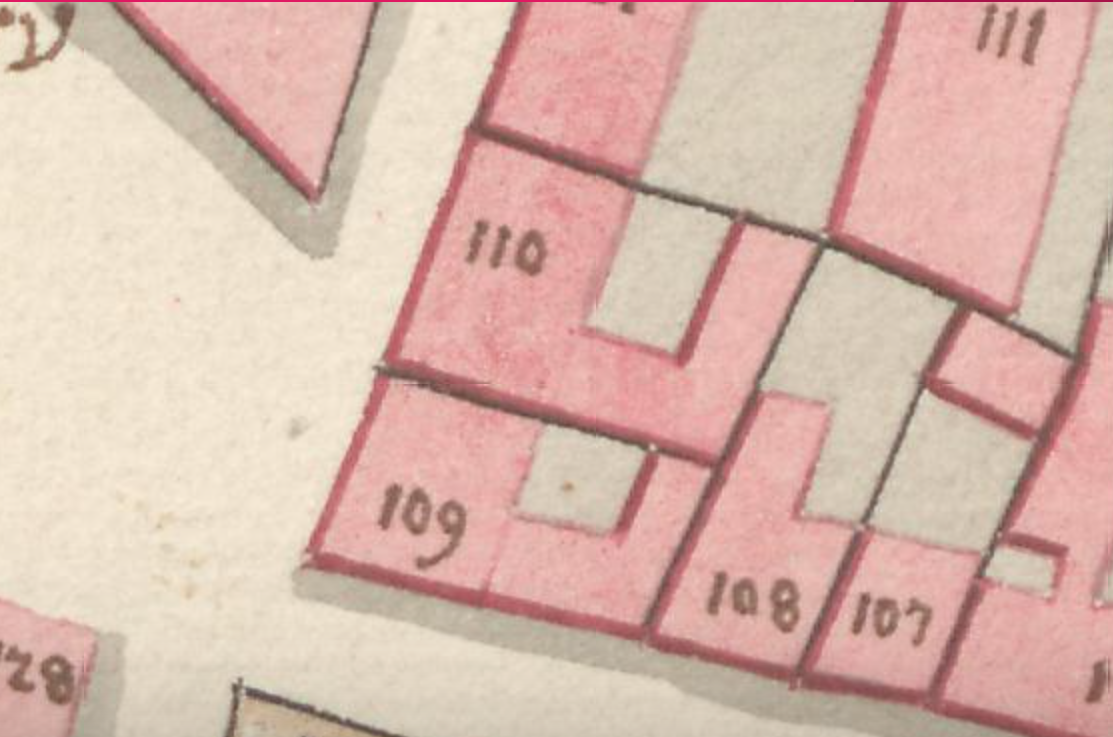
No. 109 seen on a detail from Christian Gedde's map of Frimand's Quarter, 1757.

The entire east side of Ulfeldts Plads (as Gråbrødretorv was then called) was in the late 17th century made up of one large property. This property was by 1689 as No. 122 in Frimand's Quarter owned by grocer (urtekræmmer) Herman Raben. The buildings, together with most of the other buildings in the area were destroyed in the Copenhagen Fire of 1728, The property was after the fire divided into a number of smaller properties. The present building on the site was constructed in around 1730. The property was listed in the new cadastre of 1756 as No. 109 in Frimand's Quarter, owned by Rasmus Petersen Reuter.

=== 19th century ===
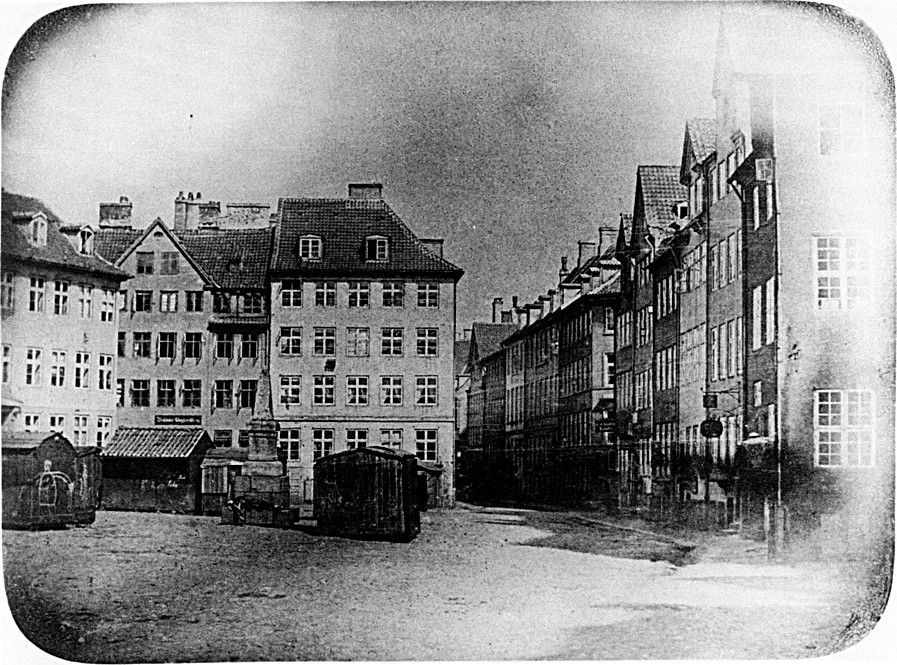
The building seen on Denmark's first daguerreotype by Peter Febar, 1840.

The building was at the time of the 1801 census owned by grocer (urtekræmmer) Peter Johannes Petersen. He was living there with his wife Dorthea Lucia née Schiøtz, his sister Susanne Magdalene Petersen, an apprentice and a maid. Georg Wilhelm Salchow (1794–1841). an auditor, resided there with his wife Hedevig née von Pultz, their three children (aged 2 to 6), a lodger and a couple of servants. The property was in the new cadastre of 1806 listed as No. 119. It was by then owned by Pedersen.

The property was later acquired by the grocer (urtekræmmer) Johan Ludvig Hammerich (1801–1866). He expanded the complex in 1932, heightening the existing corner building with one storey and constructing an extra wing in Køvstræde.

The property was at the time of the 1840 census home to a total of 48 people. Johan Ludvig Hammerich and his wife Sophie née Holm resided in the apartment on the second floor to the left with their six children and a maid. Hans Jacob Nyerup, another grocer (urtelræmmer), resided with his wife, their two children, five servants and one lodger in the apartment on the ground floor to the left. Sare Berend, a 79-year-old widow, resided with her two unmarried daughters and a maid in the apartment on the first floor to the left. Nicolay Jørgensen, a book printer, was residing with his wife, two children, three apprentices and a maid on the third floor. The other residents included a couple of tailors, a shoemaker and a mailman.

The property was at the time of the 1860 census home to a total of 35 people.The residents included a master shoemaker, a grocer (urtekræmmer), a bookseller and a watchmaker.

== Architecture ==
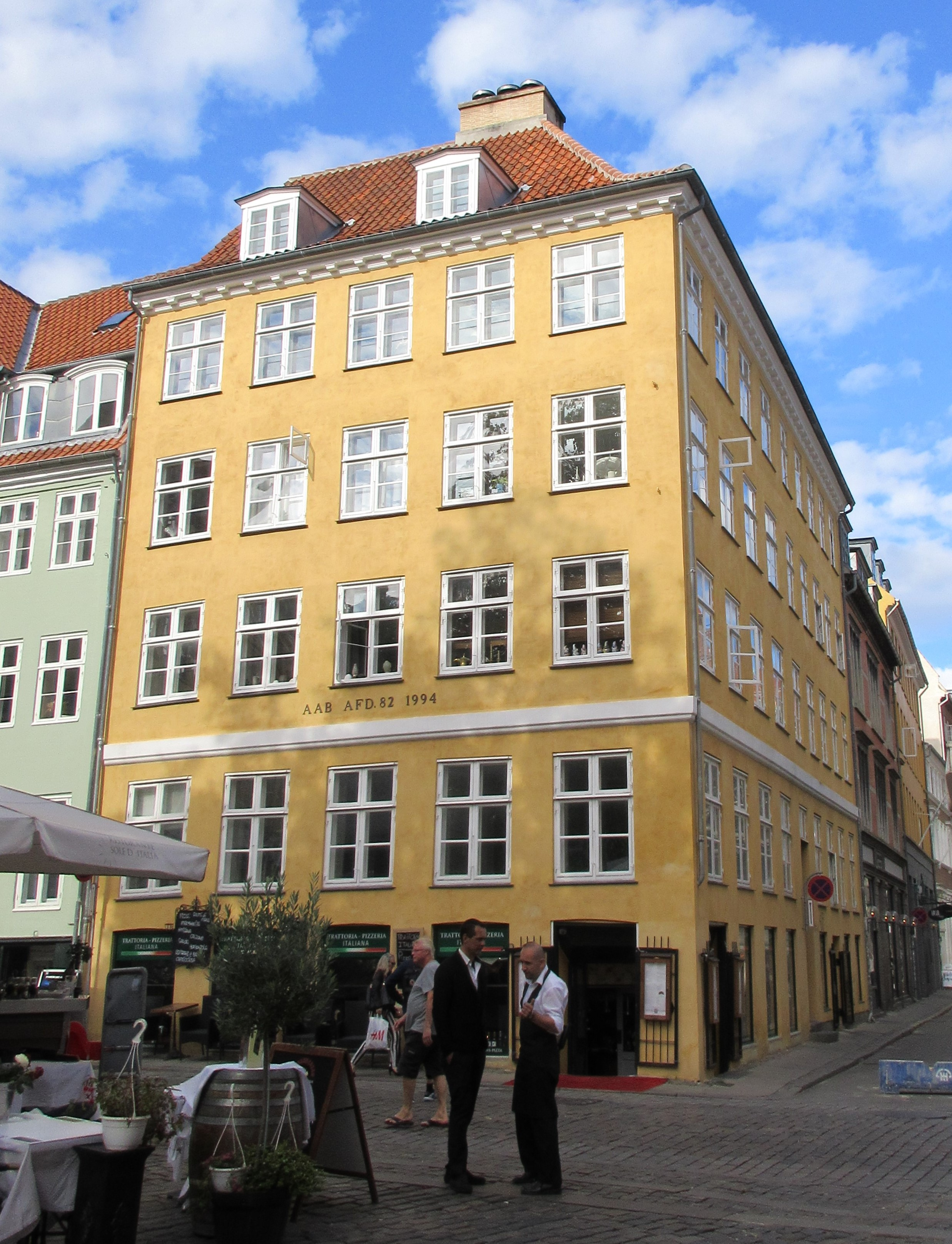
The building seen from the square.

The corner building from circa 1730 was constructed with facade crowned by a substantial wall dormer similar to that of Gråbrødretorv 4 and many of the other buildings on the square. The roof and wall dormer was converted into a full fourth storey in 1832. The property was at the same time expanded with a four bays wide perpendicular wing i Løvstræde. The main entrance is located in the bay furthest to the lest of the Løvstræde wing. The plastered, yellow facade is finished with a white belt course above the ground floor and a modillioned cornice. The roof is clad with red tiles and features two dormer windows towards the square. The rear side of the building faces a small courtyard. The corner building and the perpendicular wing meet in an outwardly curved diagonal bay. The rear side of the building is also yellow.

== Today ==
The property contains two condominiums on each floor, one in the corner building and one in the perpendicular wing. It is owned by E/F Løvstræde, 4/Gråbrødretorv 2. The basement contains a café.
