= HMS Edgar (1779) =

74-gun Royal Navy ship of the line

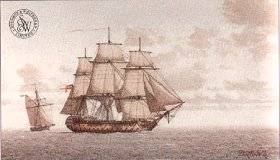
- HMS Edgar in the Downs circa 1810

History

Great Britain
- Name: HMS Edgar
- Ordered: 25 August 1774
- Builder: Woolwich Dockyard
- Laid down: 26 August 1776
- Launched: 30 June 1779
- Renamed: HMS Retribution, 1815
- Honours and awards: Participated in: Battle of Cape St. Vincent, 1780; Battle of Ushant, 1781; Battle of Cape Spartel, 1782; Battle of Copenhagen, 1801; Naval General Service Medal with clasp: "11 Aug Boat Service 1808"
- Fate: Broken up, 1835

General characteristics
- Class & type: Arrogant-class ship of the line
- Tons burthen: 1,60993/94 (bm)
- Length: 168 ft (51 m) (gundeck)
- Beam: 46 ft 9 in (14.25 m)
- Depth of hold: 19 ft 9 in (6.02 m)
- Propulsion: Sails
- Sail plan: Full-rigged ship
- Armament: 74 guns: Gundeck: 28 × 32-pounder guns; Upper gundeck: 28 × 18-pounder guns; Quarterdeck: 14 × 9-pounder guns; Forecastle: 4 × 9-pounder guns

HMS Edgar was a 74-gun third-rate ship of the line of the Royal Navy, that saw service in the American Revolutionary, French Revolutionary and Napoleonic Wars. Launched in 1779, she fought in the battles of Cape St Vincent (in 1780) and Copenhagen (in 1801), two of the major naval engagements of the wars.

Edgar also saw service as flagship to two different admirals, and was the scene of a mutiny in 1808. After the end of her active career, she was employed as a prison ship before her 56-year life came to an end in 1835, when she was ordered to be broken up.

== Construction ==
Edgar was ordered from Woolwich Dockyard on 25 August 1774. She was built to slightly modified lines of the Arrogant class, which had been designed by Sir Thomas Slade. The Arrogant class of third rates was a development over Slade's previous Bellona class, and a further nine ships were ordered from various yards, both Royal and commercial, to the same lines as Edgar. Originally, the Admiralty had intended to order her to be built to the lines of Sir John Williams' Alfred class, specifically HMS Alexander. Her keel was laid down on 26 August 1776, and she was launched on 30 June 1779.

A list composed in or around 1793, giving details of twelve Royal Navy ships, reveals that Edgar possessed a white figurehead, with details painted in red and black. Of the other eleven ships mentioned, seven had the plain white figureheads as completed by the dockyards, whilst four had painted theirs with a larger palette since being launched.

== American Revolutionary War ==
Edgar was launched when Britain was embroiled in the American Revolutionary War. She commissioned under her first captain, John Elliot, in May 1779, while her first action came on 16 January 1780, when she fought in the Battle of Cape St Vincent as part of Admiral Sir George Rodney's fleet. After a two-hour chase, Edgar was one of the first ships to engage the numerically inferior Spanish fleet.

In November 1781, the Admiralty had received intelligence that a large convoy was preparing to sail from Brest under Admiral de Guichen. It was a convoy of transports carrying naval supplies for the West Indies and the French fleet in the East Indies. Edgar was part of Admiral Richard Kempenfelt's squadron of 18 ships (11 of which mounted 64 or more guns), which he commanded from HMS Victory. Kempenfelt was ordered to intercept the convoy, which he did in the afternoon of 12 December in the Bay of Biscay, approximately 150 miles (241.4 km) south-west of Ushant. With the French naval escort to leeward of the convoy, Kempenfelt attacked immediately, capturing 15 of the transports before nightfall. The rest of the convoy scattered, most returning to Brest; only five transports reached the West Indies.

Her second major action came on 20 October 1782 when she was part of Admiral Richard Howe's fleet of 35 ships of the line at the Battle of Cape Spartel. The fleet had encountered the combined Franco-Spanish fleet of 46 ships of the line under Admiral Luis de Córdova y Córdova, and some exchange of fire took place before Admiral Howe ordered a retreat.

Edgar spent the remainder of the war in the Channel Fleet under Admiral George Darby.

== Between the wars ==
After the conclusion of the war in 1783, Edgar was fitted for service as a guardship in Portsmouth Harbour. In 1787 Captain Charles Thompson took command, and in spring 1788 she served as Rear-Admiral John Leveson-Gower's flagship whilst he commanded his fleet of observation on its two-month cruise off the Irish coast and west of the Scilly Isles. At the end of this cruise, Edgar returned to Portsmouth where she resumed her role as guardship.

Edgar was recommissioned in April 1791 and joined the home fleet.

== French Revolutionary War ==
After France's declaration of war against Great Britain brought the country into the French Revolutionary War in 1793, Edgar, under the command of Captain Bertie, captured the French privateer Dumourier, which had earlier captured the Spanish ship Santa Jago (or St Jago), in April. Edgar was part of a squadron commanded by Admiral John Gell. A large amount of treasure was found on Dumourier valued at over £½ million. Edgar, St George, Egmont, Ganges, and Phaeton escorted St Jago to Portsmouth. that escorted St Jago back to Portsmouth. The ownership of the Spanish ship was a matter of some debate and was not settled until 4 February 1795, when the value of the cargo was put at £935,000. At this time all the crew, captains, officers and admirals received a share of the prize money, with Admiral Hood's share standing at £50,000.

In 1794 the crew of HMS Defiance rose up in mutiny whilst the ship lay in Leith Roads. Edgar was ordered alongside Defiance, and if it were deemed necessary to restore order, to engage her. A comment left by one of Edgar's crew suggests that had the order been given to fire, it would not have been obeyed, as the crew thought that the mutineers aboard Defiance were in the right. In 1800 Edgar was part of the Channel Fleet under Admiral Sir Alan Gardner blockading the important French port of Brest. She was forced to return to Plymouth on 18 February after sustaining damage to her mainmast, and after repairs sailed from Plymouth with HMS Dragon, rejoining the Fleet on 13 May. Edgar was driven from her station on blockade duty on 9 November by hurricane-force winds, and again put into Plymouth for repairs.

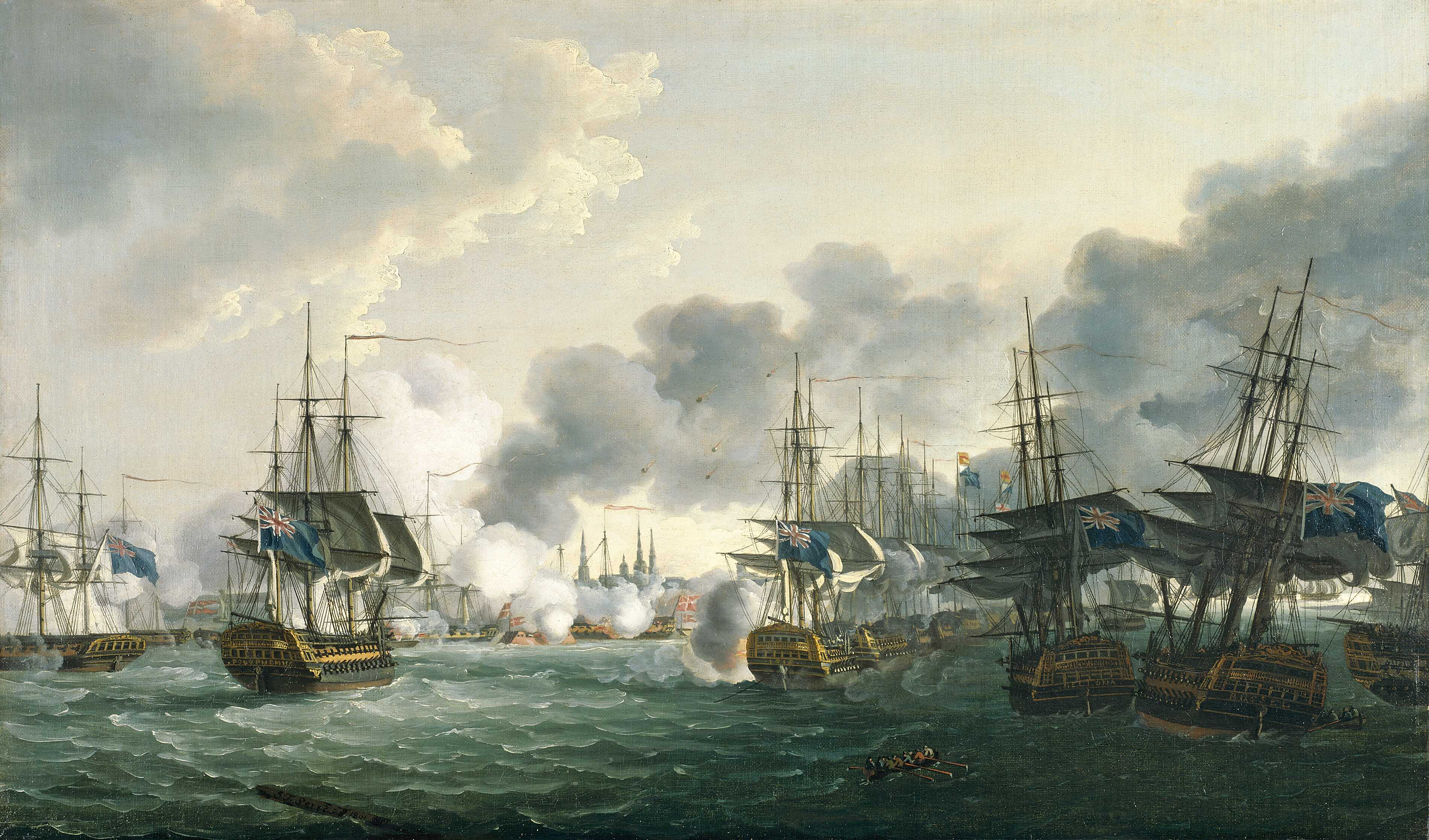
Edgar at the Battle of Copenhagen, 2 April 1801

On 28 February 1801, Captain George Murray took over the command of Edgar, transferring from Achille. On 2 April 1801, Edgar took part in the Battle of Copenhagen. After passing down the Outer Channel in order to negotiate the southern tip of the Middle Ground shoal off the coast from Copenhagen, Edgar was leading Vice-Admiral Horatio Nelson's line, and was the first to commence firing, as soon as she was in range of the Danish Prövesteen. Edgar was forced to fight unsupported for some time, as the next ship in line, Agamemnon, had run aground on the poorly charted Middle Ground, requiring Polyphemus, the next in line after Agamemnon, to manoeuvre around the stranded ship. During the course of the battle, Edgar had 31 killed, including the First Lieutenant and three soldiers of the 49th Regiment, and 115 men were wounded.

== Napoleonic Wars ==
The Revolutionary War was brought to an end on 25 March 1802 with the Treaty of Amiens, and war gave way to a period of uneasy peace. In June 1802 Edgar was taken into Chatham for repairs. She was recommissioned in 1805 as part of the doubling and bracing programme, and served as Admiral Lord Keith's flagship off Texel, blockading the Dutch coast. Edgar, along with several other ships, was in the Downs on 17 December, when HMS Victory came in to shelter from gales that had blown up, hampering her progress to Chatham. Victory was returning to England after the Battle of Trafalgar, and on board was the body of the late Vice-Admiral Lord Nelson.

On 28 March 1808, there was an attempted mutiny on board whilst Edgar was lying in Cawsand Bay. The crew had all gathered on the quarterdeck, but dispersed at the threat of a murderous volley from the ship's company of marines. Five men, including the captain of the main-top and the bosun's mate, were arrested and placed in irons. The five were tried for mutiny aboard Salvador del Mundo in the Hamoaze on 9 and 11 April. All were found guilty, despite attempts by Edgar's petty officers to prove that they had been goaded into their actions by threats from the rest of the crew. Each of the men was sentenced to be flogged round the fleet, with the captain of the main-top, Henry Chesterfield, receiving a total of 700 lashes and two-years' solitary confinement; the bosun's mate, John Rowlands, received one-year's confinement and 300 lashes; two of the remaining men received 200 lashes each, and one 500 lashes.

=== Gunboat War ===
In May 1808 Edgar was one of the 12 ships of the line forming part of Vice-Admiral Sir James Saumarez's squadron sent to the Baltic after Denmark's declaration of war against Sweden. By this time, Sweden had allied herself with Britain, but both Denmark and Russia were allies of Buonaparte. Saumarez, who had his flag in Victory, was therefore tasked with keeping the Baltic open to British trade, and with promoting British interests in the region. The Gunboat War with Denmark lasted from 1807 until 1814.

When word of the uprising of the Spanish against the French in 1808 reached Denmark, some 12,000 Spanish troops stationed in Denmark and under the Marquis de la Romana decided that they wished to leave French service and return to Spain. The Marquis contacted Rear-Admiral Keats, on Superb, who was in command of a small British squadron in the Kattegat. They agreed a plan and on 9 August 1808 the Spaniards seized the fort and town of Nyborg. Keats then prepared to take possession of the port and to organize the departure of the Spanish. Keats informed the Danish authorities that if they did not impede the operation he would spare the town. The Danes agreed, except for the captains of two small Danish warships in the harbour.

On 11 August Keats sent in the boats from Edgar, under the command of her captain, James Macnamara. The boats captured the brig Fama, of 18 guns and under the command of Otto Frederick Rasch, and the cutter Søormen, of 12 guns and under the command of Thøger Emil Rosenørn. Despite the odds Rasch and Rosenørn refused and put up a stiff resistance before they struck. (Note: Translation from the Danish websites and .) British losses were an officer killed and two men wounded; the Danes lost seven men killed and 13 wounded. In 1847 the Admiralty authorized the issue of the Naval General Service Medal with clasp "11 Aug. Boat Service 1808" to all surviving claimants of the action.

The British organized the evacuation of the Spanish troops using some 50 or so local boats. Some 10,000 troops returned to Spain via Britain. (Note: Not all the Spaniards got away. Two squadrons of Spanish cavalry based as far away as Horsens on Jutland tried, on 10 August 1808, to make their way to Nyborg, but were stopped at the Little Belt crossing where Danish and French troops had reacted quickly to prevent further deserters crossing to the island of Funen.(from Danish website))

In early July 1810 Edgar, in company with Dictator and Alonzo, sighted three Danish gunboats under the command of Lieutenant Peter Nicolay Skibsted, who had captured the Grinder in April of that year. The gunboats (Husaren, Løberen, and Flink) sought refuge in Grenå, on eastern Jutland, where a company of soldiers and their field guns could provide cover. However, the British mounted a cutting out expedition of some 200 men in ten ships’ boats after midnight on 7 July, capturing the three gunboats. (Note: Skibsted spent a year as a prisoner of war in England. On his return to Denmark he underwent a court martial, was reprimanded for the loss of his vessels and ordered to pay the courts costs.)

== Fate ==
Edgar was laid up in ordinary at Chatham in 1811. She underwent a conversion to serve as a prison hulk in 1813, and was renamed Retribution in 1815. She continued to serve in this role until 1835, when the decision was taken to have her broken up.

== Bibliography ==
- Goodwin, Peter (2002). Nelson's Ships – A History of the Vessels in which he Served, 1771–1805. Conway Maritime Press. ISBN 978-0-85177-742-9.
- Goodwin, Peter (2005). The Ships of Trafalgar: The British, French and Spanish Fleets October 1805. Conway Maritime Press. ISBN 1-84486-015-9.
- Lavery, Brian (2000). Nelson's Navy: The Ships, Men and Organisation 1793–1815. Conway Maritime Press. ISBN 0-85177-521-7.
- Lavery, Brian (1983). The Ship of the Line – Volume 1: The development of the battlefleet 1650–1850. Conway Maritime Press. ISBN 0-85177-252-8.
- Long, William H. (1895) Medals of the British navy and how they were won: with a list of those officers, who for their gallant conduct were granted honorary swords and plate by the Committee of the Patriotic Fund. (London: Norie & Wilson).
- Mayo, John Horsley (1897) Medals and decorations of the British Army and Navy. (John Constable).
- (in Danish) Topsøe-Jensen, T. A. and Emil Marquard (1935) Officerer i den dansk-norske Søetat 1660–1814 og den danske Søetat 1814–1932 (Translates as: Officers of the Danish-Norwegian Naval Service 1660 -1814 and the Danish Naval Service 1814–1932). (Copenhagen: H. Gagerup).
- Winfield, Rif (2007). British Warships of the Age of Sail 1714–1792: Design, Construction, Careers and Fates. Seaforth. ISBN 978-1-86176-295-5.
