= Schibsted (name) =

Schibsted is a name. Notable people with the name include:

- Christian Schibsted (1812–1878), Norwegian printer and publisher
- Amandus Schibsted (1849–1913), Norwegian newspaper owner and editor
- Agnethe Schibsted-Hansson (1868–1951), Norwegian actress
- Henrik Jørgen Schibsted Huitfeldt (1907–1979), Norwegian newspaper editor
- Gro Sandvik (born 1942), full name Gro Schibsted Sandvik, Norwegian flautist
- Aase Schibsted Knudsen (born 1954), Norwegian writer and academic

== See also ==
- Skibsted
