= Niels Hemmingsens Gade 32 =

Historic building in Copenhagen, Denmark

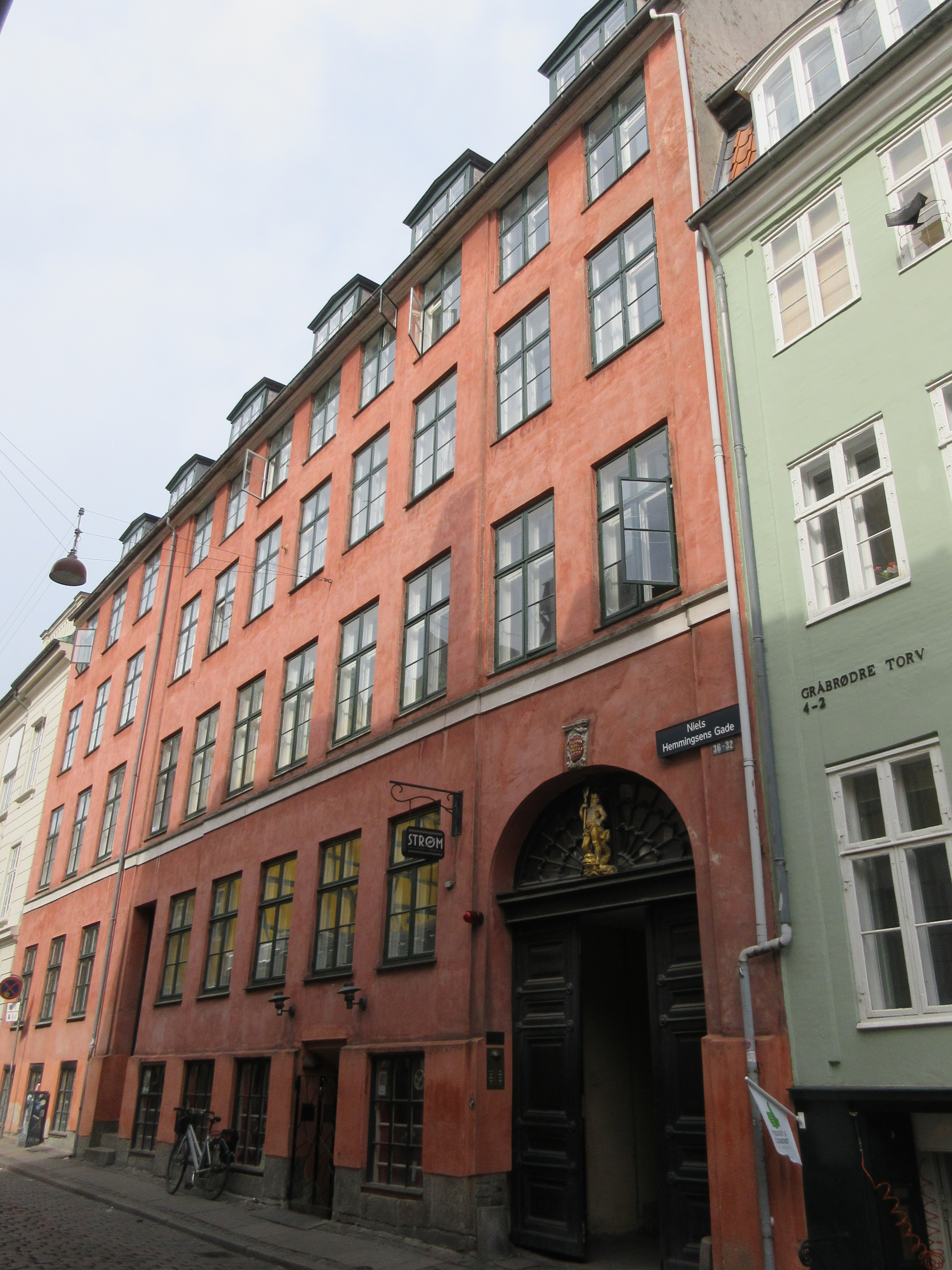
- Interactive map of the Niels Hemmingsens Gade 32 area

General information
- Location: Copenhagen. Denmark, Denmark
- Coordinates: 55°40′49.01″N 12°34′34.03″E
- Completed: C. 1744

Niels Hemmingsens Gade 32 is a historic building in the Old Town of Copenhagen, Denmark. It was built in the first half of the 1740s. A brewery was for more than one hundred years operated in a rear wing. Brødrene Cloëtta, one of Denmark's leading chocolate manufacturers of its day, was based in the building from 1865 until 1901. The three-winged building complex was listed on the Danish registry of protected buildings and places in 1981. A gilded Neptune figure is seen above the gateway and the keystone features the names of the first owners. Notable former residents include the naval officers Poul de Løvenørn and Peter Nicolay Skibsted, the businessman Conrad Hauser and the linguist Rasmus Rask.

== History ==
=== Early history ===
The site was formerly part of two separate properties. One of these properties was listed as No. 122 in Frimand's Quarter in Copenhagen's first cadastre of 1689 and was at that time owned by grocer (urtekræmmer) Herman Raben. The other property was as No. 123 owned by trumpeter Ambrosius Leffelmann.

=== Klog and the new building ===
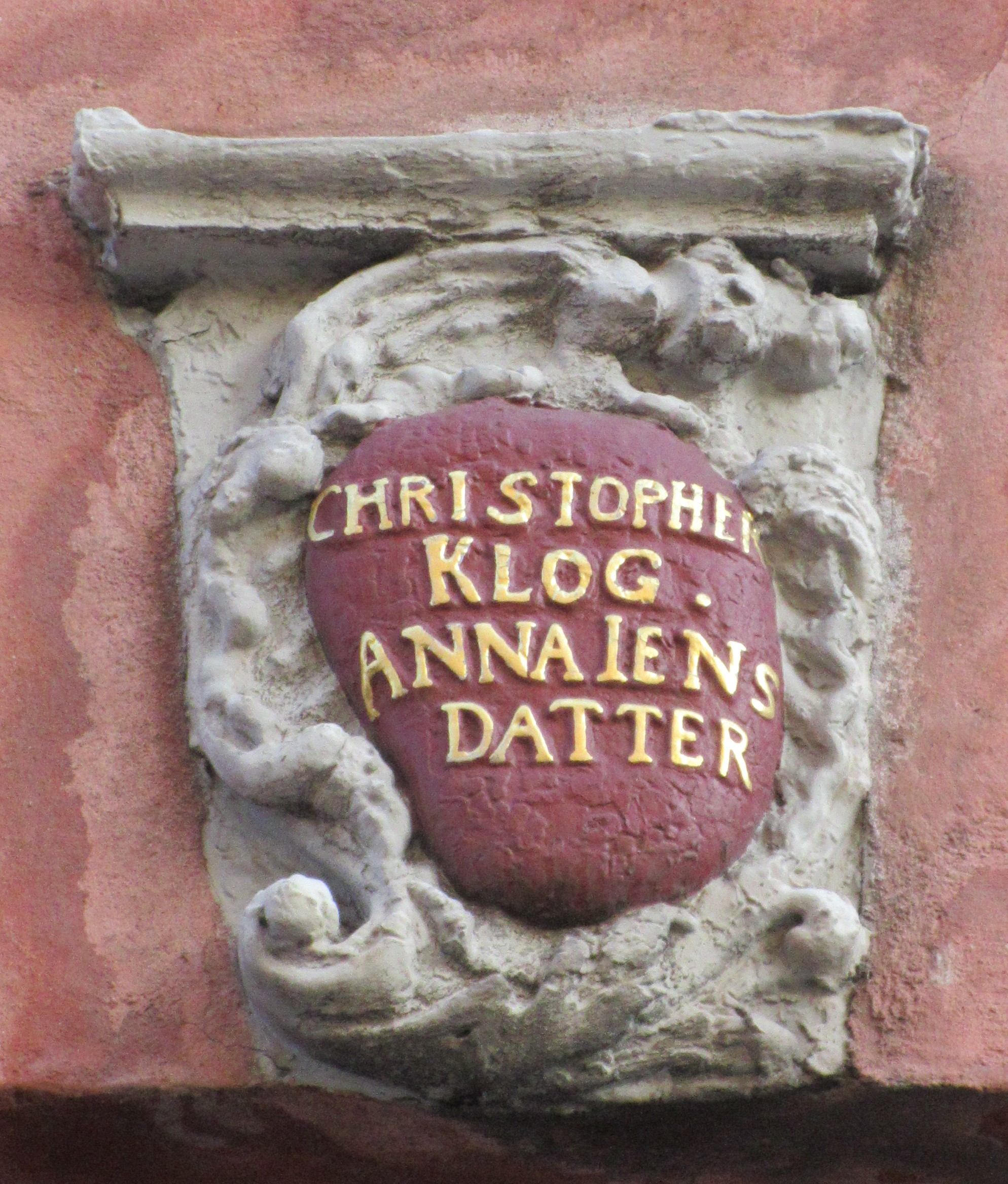
Christopher Klog's and Anna Jensdatter's names seen on the keystone above the gate.

The two buildings were both destroyed in the Copenhagen Fire of 1728, together with most of the other buildings in the area. The present building on the site was constructed in 1739–1744 for brewer and merchant Christopher Klog (1696–1750).. He also served as director of Copenhagen Fire Insurance Company. He was married to Anna Jensdatter (1818-1843). They had one daughter and one son. The daughter Anne Lisbeth Klog (1830-1886) would later marry Hans Christian Bech (1721-1781), a merchant and councilman in Copenhagen. The son Jacob Klog (1740-1782) would become a Secretary of War (krigssekretær). In 1743, Anna Jensdatter Klog fell ill and died just half a year later just 23 years old.

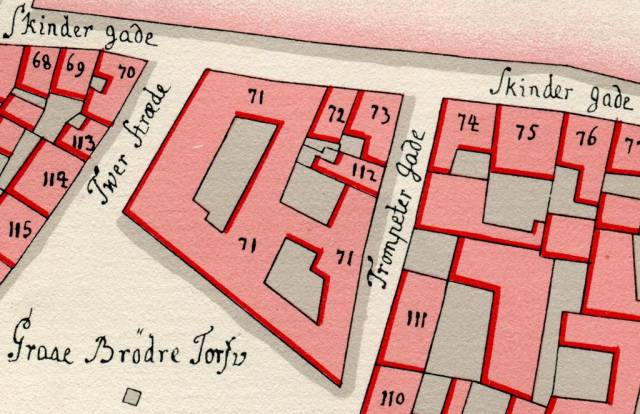
No. 111 seen on a detail from Christian Gedde's map of Frimand's Quarter, 1757.

Klog was some time later married to Johanne Angelberg (1719-1772). She became a widow in 1759. Her property was listed in the new cadastre of 1756 as No. 111.

=== Skibsted family ===
Johanne Angelberg was some time latermarried to brewer and merchant Michael Skibsted (1699-1775). He also served as director of the Copenhagen Fire Insurance Company. The brewery was after his death in 1775 continued by their eldest son Andreas Skibsted (1752-1806).

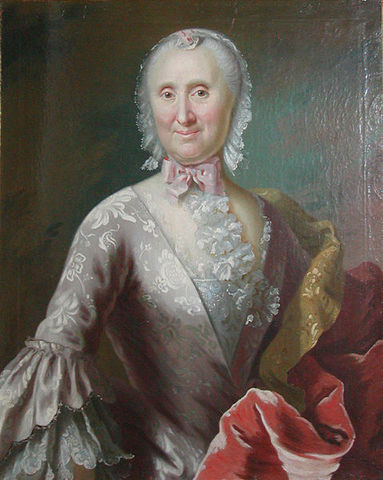
Elisabeth Andersdatter Kall, née Wøldike.

At the time of the 1787 census, Skibsted's building was home to a total of 35 residents in five households. Skivsted resided in one of the apartments with his wife Magrete Cathrine Porth, their three children (aged one to nine), a brewer, a brewer's apprentice, a caretaker, a coachman, a male servant and three maids. His brother Poul Skibsted, a Supreme Court attorney, resided in another apartment with his wife Christine Magdalene Olivarius, their four children (aged one to nine), two male servants and three maids. Elisabeth Andersdatter Kall (née Wøldike, 1721–1791), widow of filolofist and former rector of Copenhagen University Johan Christian Kall, resided in the building with her 21-year-old daughter Cathrina and two maids. Nicolay Døllner /1750-1840), auditor of the Greenland Trading Department as well as the Iceland, Telemark and FFaroese Trading Company, resided in the third apartment with three lodgers. Michel Anoerten, a beer seller (øltapper), resided in the building with his wife Karen Magrethe and four lodgers.

The naval officer Poul de Løvenørn (1751–1826) was among the residents of the building from 1794 to 1797.

At the time of the 1801 census, Skibsted's property was home to 31 residents in six households. Skibsted's own household consisted of 11 people. His son Peter Nicolay Skibsted had enrolled at the Royal Naval Cadet Academy. Conrad Hauser, a Swiss-born businessman, resided in another apartment with his wife, their foster daughter, a lodger and two maids. Lodger Conrad Grove (1780–1829) was a second lieutenant in the Royal Dano-Norwegian Navy. His mother was the sister of Hauser's wife Karen. His father Johan Christian Grove (1713–1784) had been secretary of the Danish Admiralty. Johannes Jacobsen, a merchant, resided in another apartment with his wife Sophie Elisabeth Zeuten, their two daughters and a maid. Lauritz Bremer, minister for the Danish congregation in London, was also resided in the building with his wife Laurine Richardt when they were not in London. The last household consisted of the beer vendor (øltapper) Anders Madsen, his wife Inger Mortens and their three lodgers.

The property was listed as in the new cadastre of 1805 as No. 117 in Frimand's Quarter. Andreas Skibsted died in February the same year. The linguist Rasmus Rask (1787–1832) was among the resident in the building in 1830 but then moved to Skindergade 6.

=== Søren Sørensen's brewery ===
No. 117 was home to a total of 28 residents at the time of the 1840 census. Søren Sørensen, a brewer, resided there with his wife Ane Helene, their four children (aged two to 15), two, brewery workers and two maids. Margrethe Skibsted, now 64 years old and a widow, resided on the first floor with her foster son Frederik Dunlop from the Danish West Indies, lodger Francicius Røchter and two maids. A third household consisted of clerk Hendrik Thomassen Dalberg, his wife Ingeborg Frederikke née Hansen, accountant Henrich Porth and one maid. Ester Meyer, a widow, resided in the building with her son (master tailor) and daughter, one lodger (tailor/employee) and one maid. Lars Rasmussen, an barkeeper, resided in the basement with his son, one lodger (master joiner) and one maid.

Sørensen's property was five years later home to 29 residents. His own household consisted of 13 people. Stentzel Thomassen Dalberg, a later county administrator (amtsforvalter), was five years later residing in the first floor apartment with his wife Ingeborg (née Hansen), their four children (aged one to five) and two maids. Caroline Seedorff, a widow with a pension, resided on the second floor with her two sons (aged 27 and 34) and one lodger. The barkeeper Lars Rasmussen was still residing in the basement with his six-year-old son, one maid and one lodger.

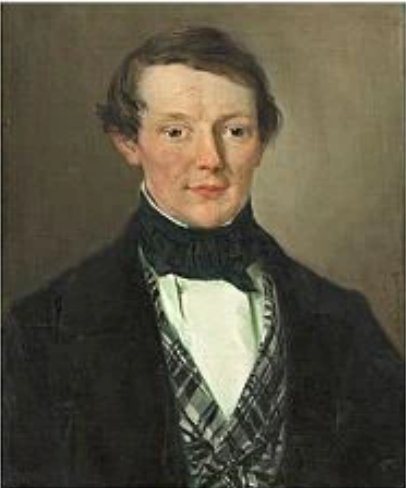
Christian Georg Wille

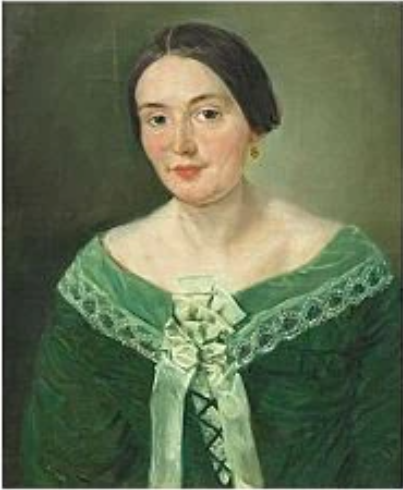
Emilie Charlotte Will

Sørensenbrewery closed in the late 1840s. He also moved but without selling the property. At the time of the 1850 census, Sørensen's property in Niels Hemmingsens Gade was home to 37 residents in nine households. Lars Rasmussen was now residing on the ground floor of the rear wing. His household consisted of people. Edvard Ursin, a master bookbinder, resided on the ground floor with his wife Nathalie Sophie Schytte, their two children (aged one and three), his sister-in-law Julie Sophie Schytte and one maid. Christian Georg Wille, a sculptor, resided on the first floor with his wife Emilie Charlotte Fischer, his sister-in-law Juliane Christine Fischer and a nine-years-old girl. Gabriel Jan Joseph Herbert le Monnin, a portrait painter, resided on the second floor with his wife Ane Kirstine Appelt. Lars Rasmussen was still residing in the basement with his wife, daughter and one lodger. Johanne Margrethe Schmidt, a widow resided on the first floor of the rear wing. Dorothea Sophie Frederikke Sibbern, an "institute manager" (institutbestyrerinde), was also residing on the first floor of the rear wing. Else Olsen, another widow, resided on the second floor of the rear wing with her daughter Emma Marie Olsen and one maid. Ane Christine Petersen, a third widow, was also residing on the second floor of the rear wing with her daughter.

In 1853–54, Sørensen carried out a comprehensive renovation of the complex. It was in this connection expanded from eight to 11 bays.

=== Cloetta's chocolate factory, 1865–1901 ===
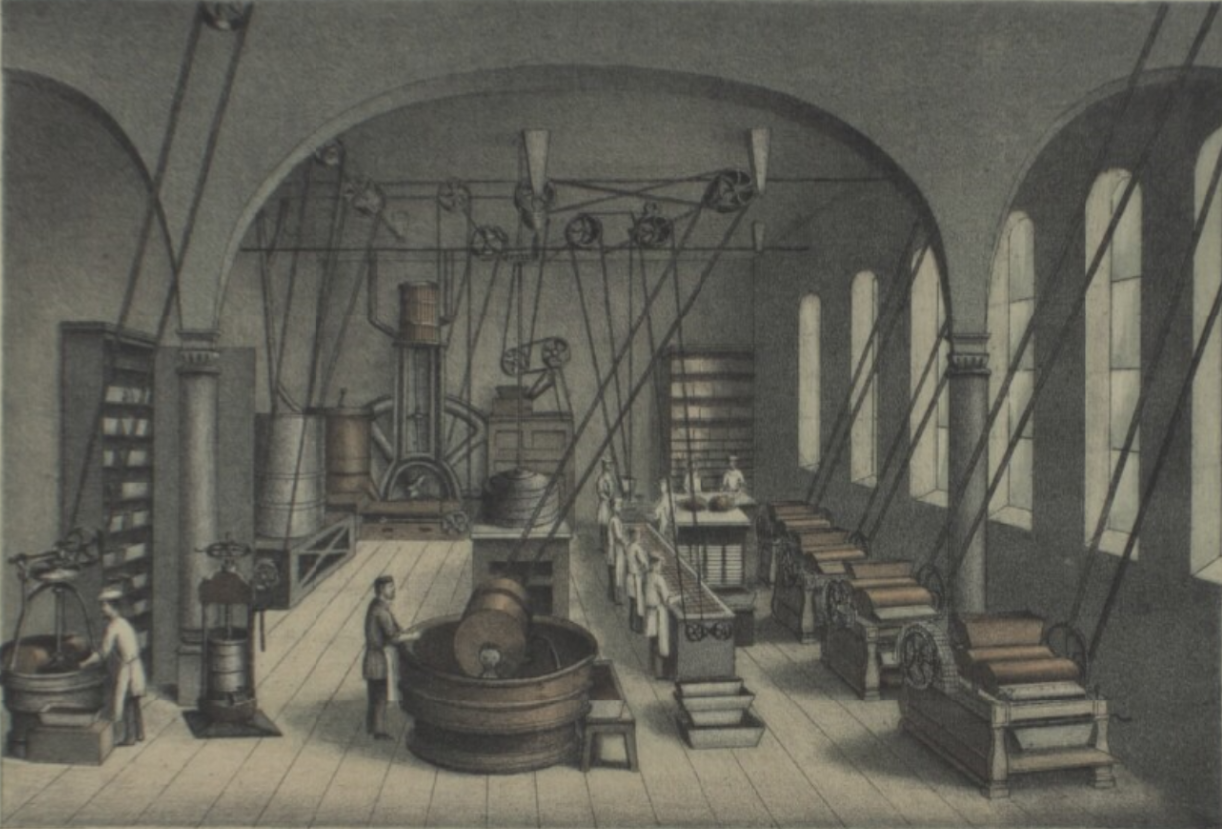
Brødrene Cloëtta's chocolate factory in Niels Hemmingsens Gade

In 1865, Brødrene Cloëtta purchased the building as a new home for the chocolate factory. The building was heightened with one storey between 1869 and 1873. Christoph Cloëtta resided in the first-floor apartment.

After Christoph Cloëtta’s death in 1897, bernhard returned to Switzerland, while Christoph's widow and son Fritz continued the factory.

In 1901, it relocated to a new building in Hørsholmsgade, making it the largest of its kind in the Nordic region. The new factory building was designed by Ludvig Knudsen.

== Architecture ==
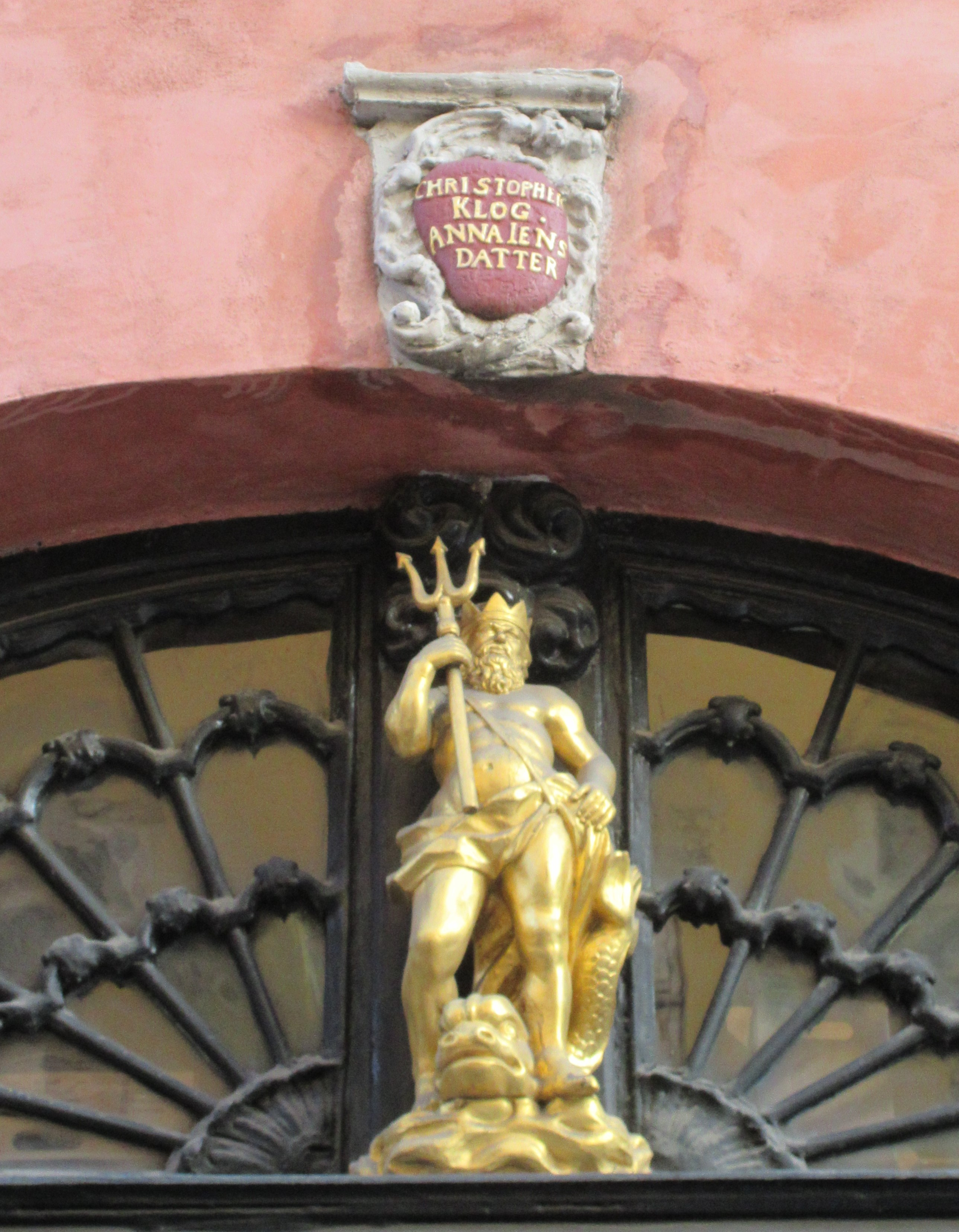
The Neptune figure above the gateway

The building seen today is constructed with four storeys over a walk-out basement, It is 11 bays wide and the red tile roof features six dormer windows towards the street and four dormer windows towards the courtyard. The facade is rendered in a pale red colour and is finished with a white cornice under the roof and a white belt course above the ground floor. A short granite staircase in the fourth bay from the left provides access to the main entrance and a short granite staircase at the eighth bay leads down to a separate entrance to the cellar. A gateway on the right side of the building opens to a small courtyard. In front of the fanlight stands a gilded statuette of Neptune. The keystone above the gate features the names Christopher Klog and Anna Jensdatter.

Kloug's original house from c. 1744 was an eight-bay building over two storeys with a four-bay wall dormer. It was expanded into an 11-bay-long, three-storey building in 1853–1854 and the fourth storey was added in 1869–1873.

== Today ==
The property was owned by E/F Niels Hemmingsens Gade 32. It houses a bar in the basement and ten condominiums on the upper floors.

== Gallery ==
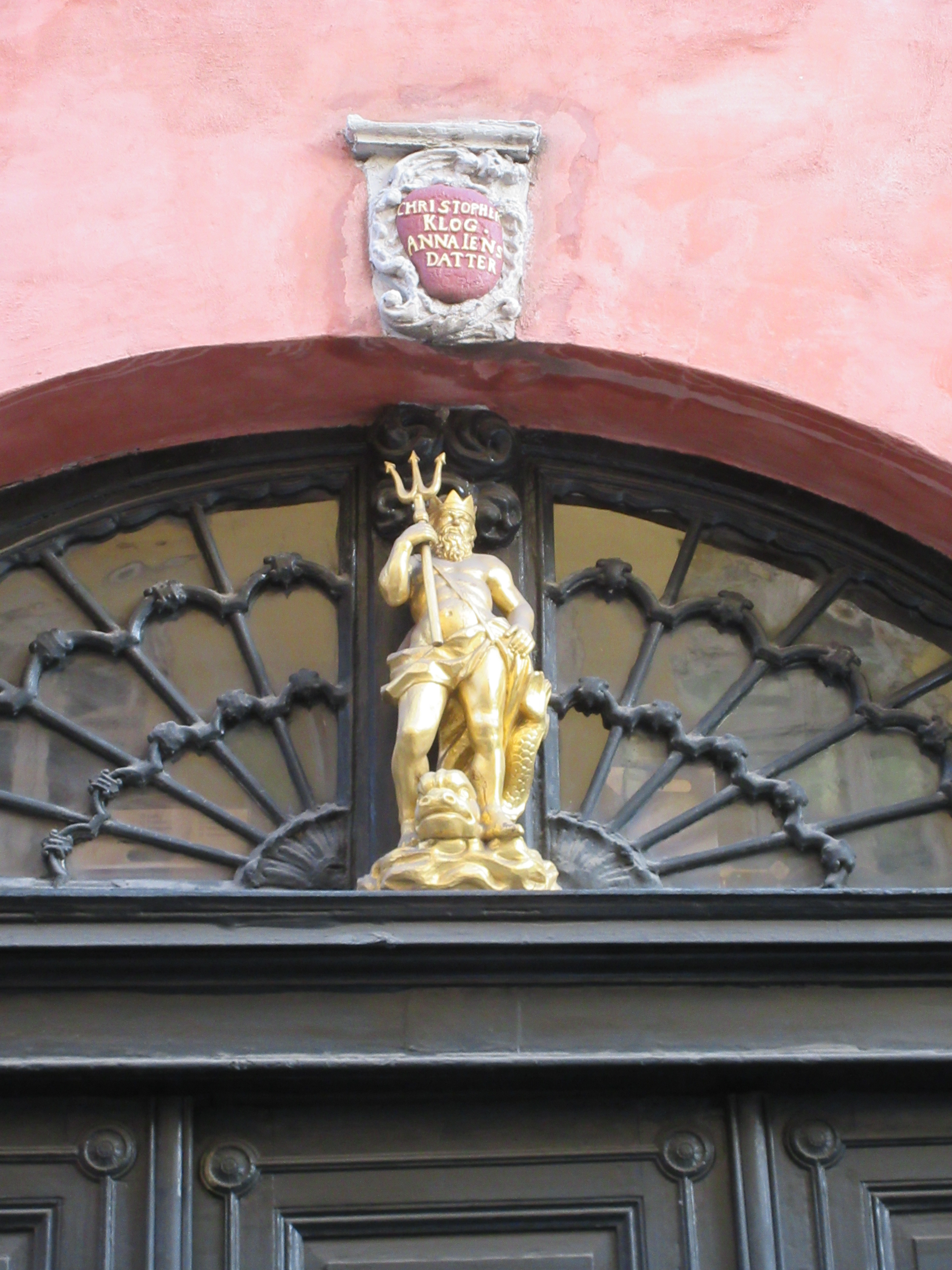
Detail of the Neptune figure above the gate.

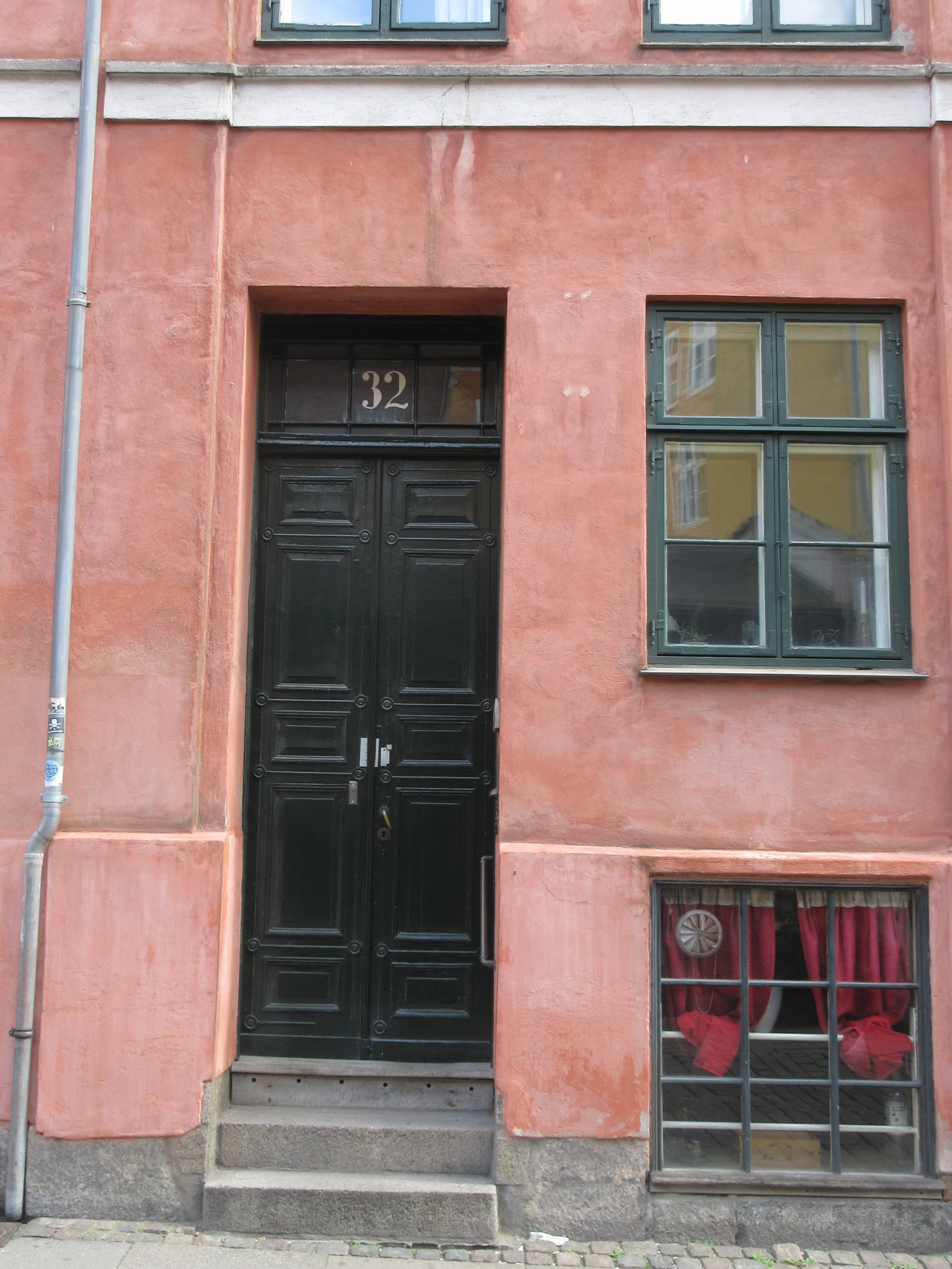
The main entrance of the front wing.

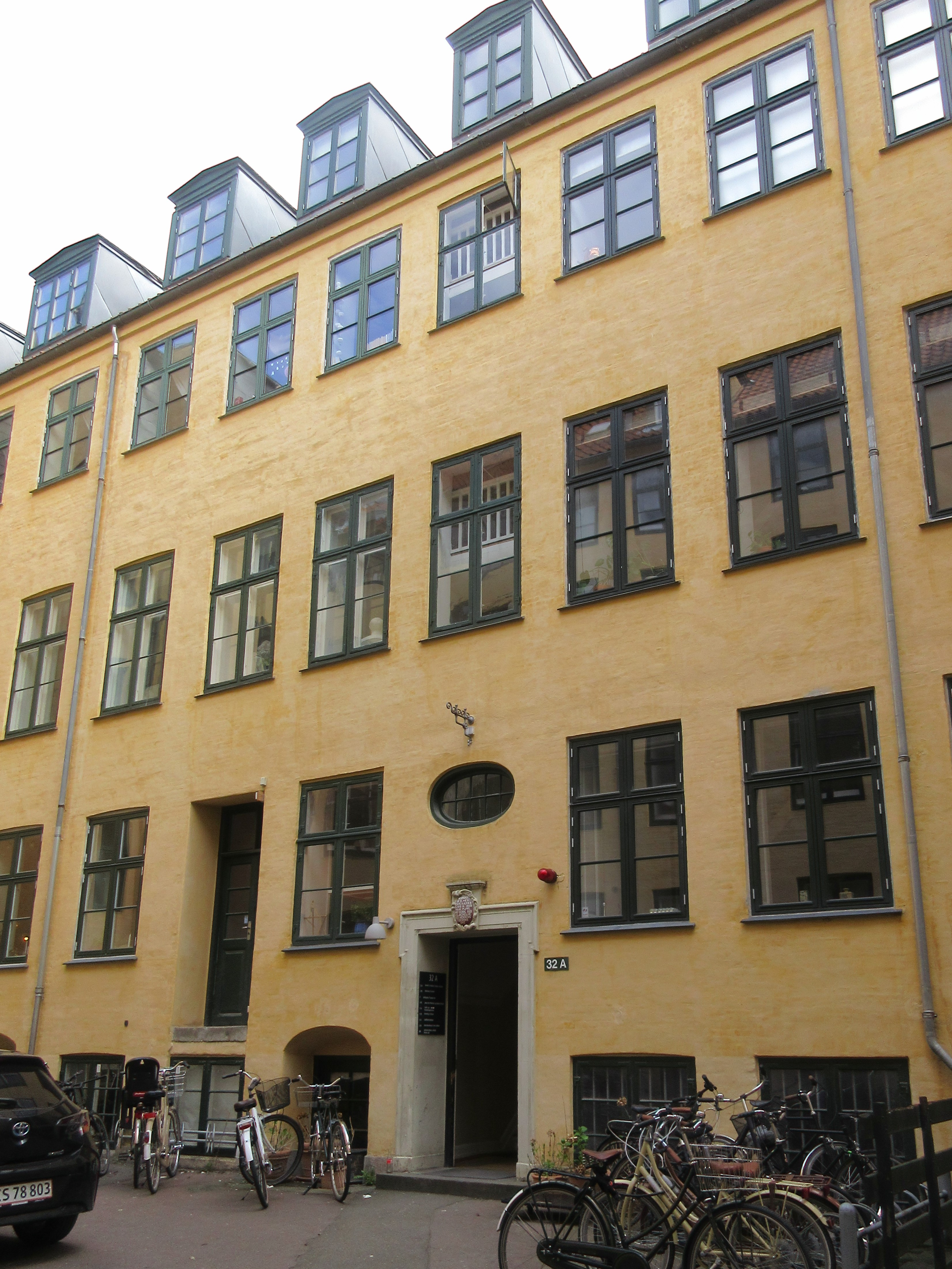
The rear wing

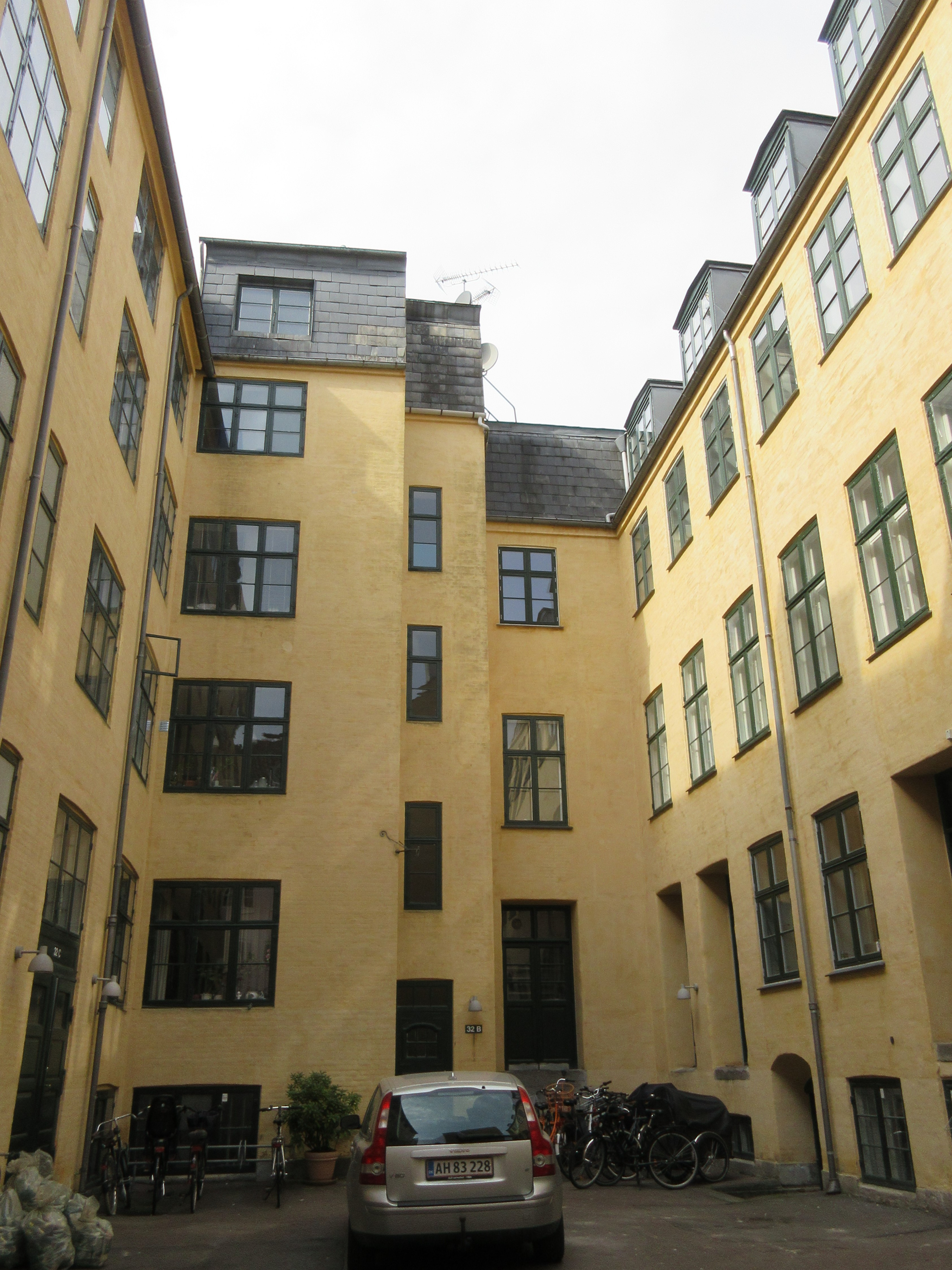
The side wing with a bit of the rear wing visible to the right.

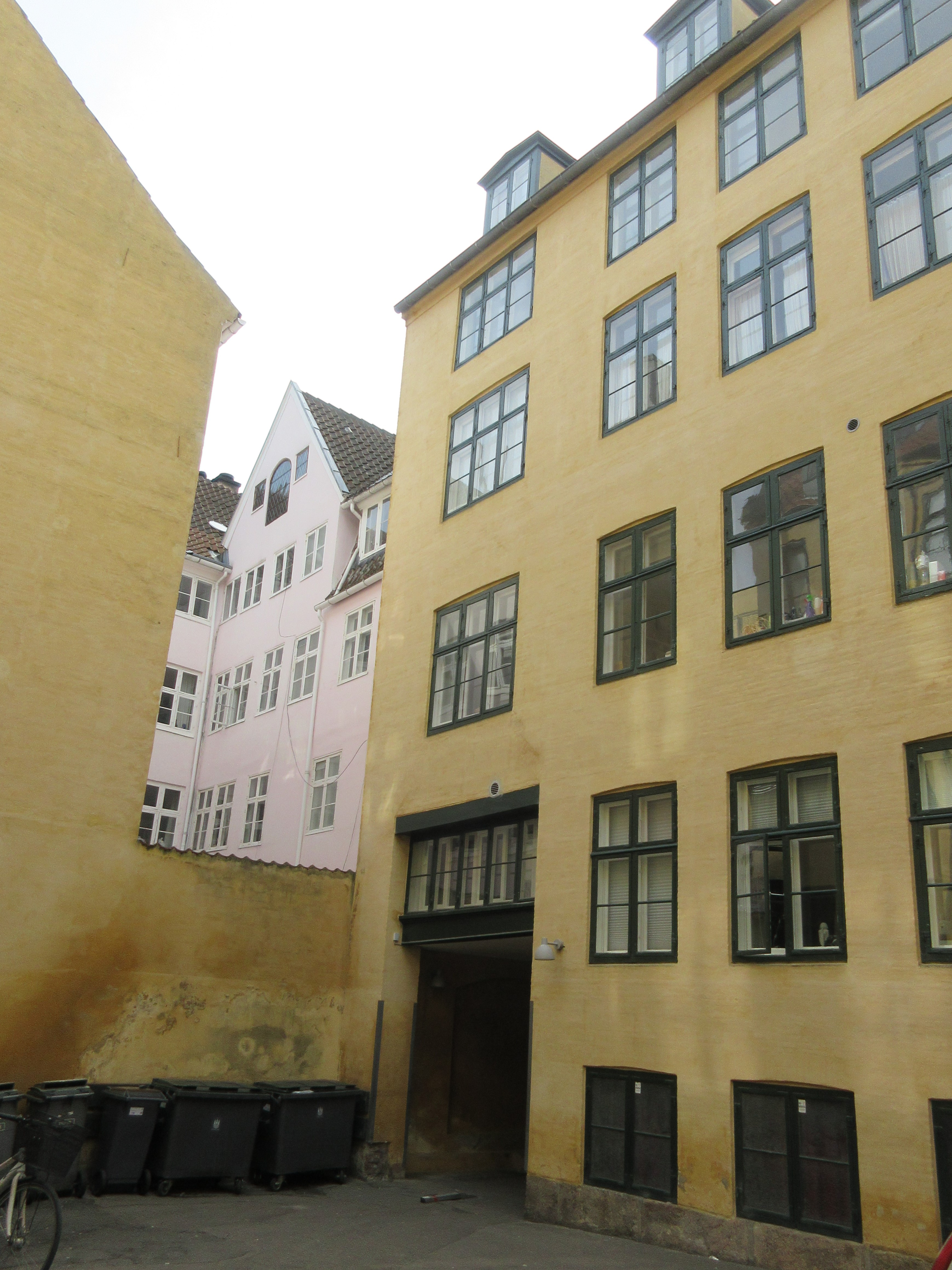
The rear side of the front wing with a peek into the courtyard of Gråbrødretorv 4.

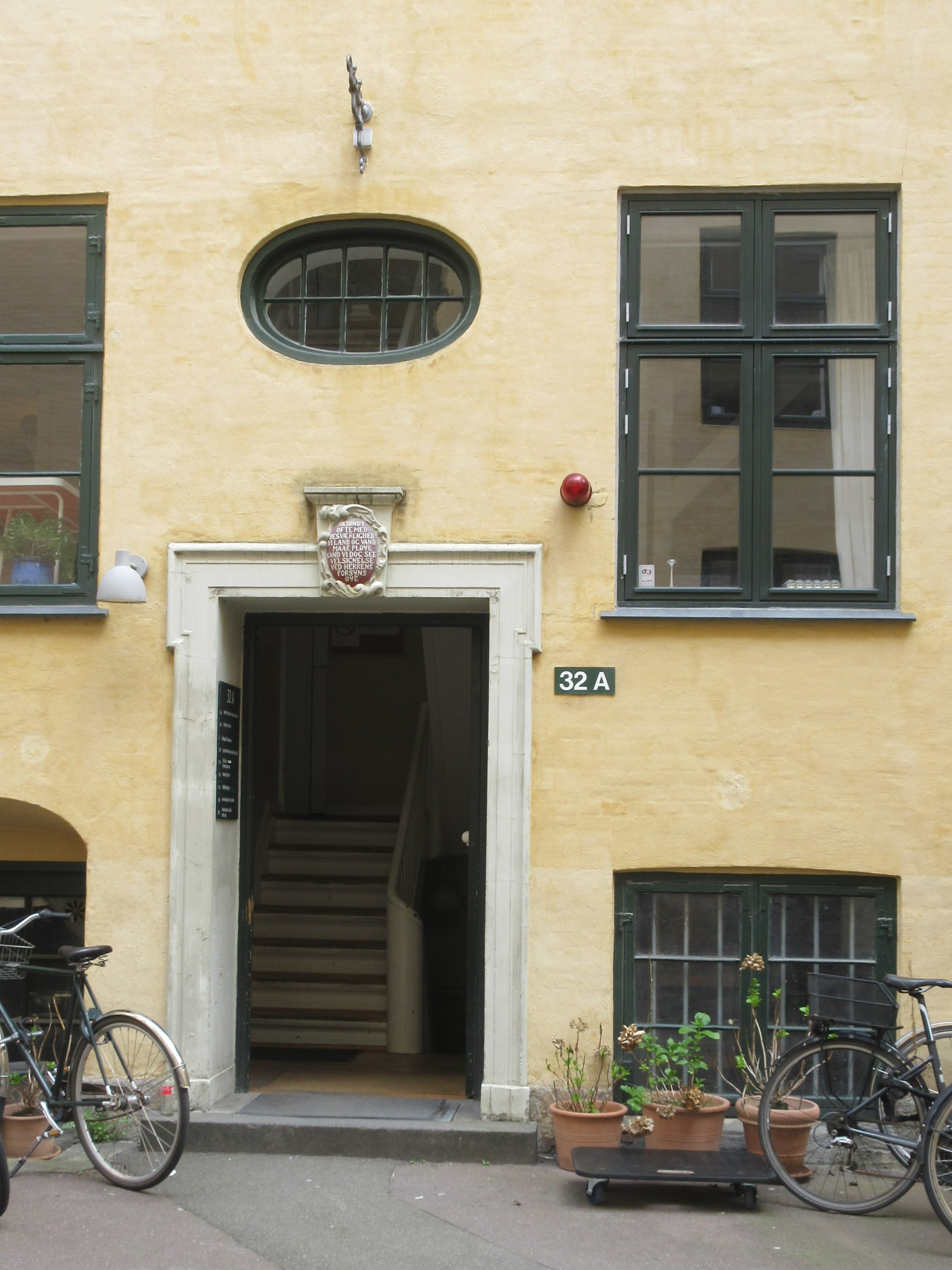
Door of the rear wing.

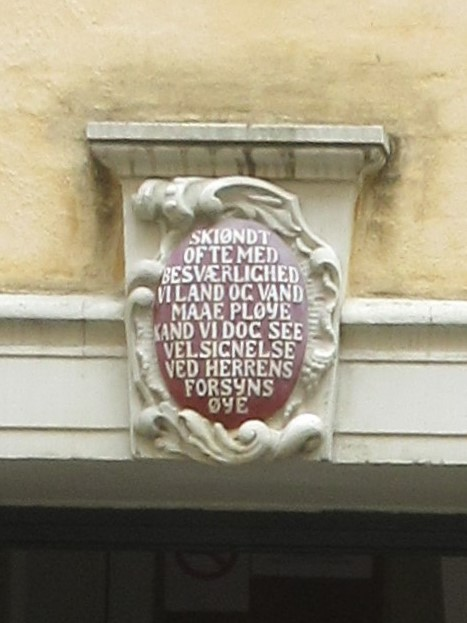
The cartouche above the door of the rear wing.
