= Peter Nicolay Skibsted =

Danish naval officer (1787–1832)

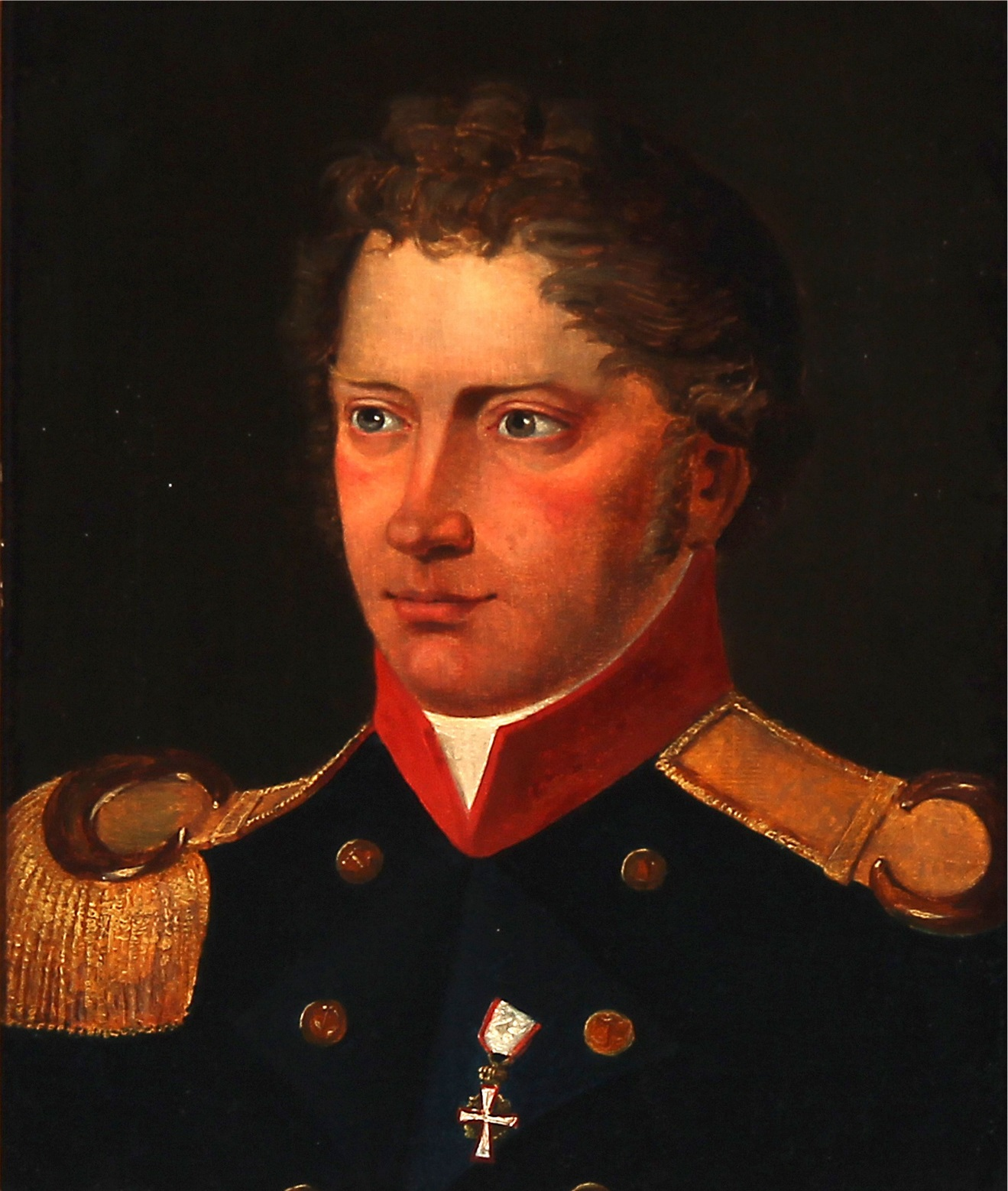
- Born: 12 January 1787; Copenhagen, Denmark
- Died: 18 April 1832 (aged 45); Copenhagen, Denmark
- Burial place: Holmens Kirke, Copenhagen; 55°40′36″N 12°35′0″E
- Military career
- Allegiance: Denmark
- Branch: Royal Danish Navy
- Service years: 1798–1832
- Rank: Captain
- Conflicts: Gunboat War; Battle of Copenhagen; HMS Grinder; Grenå Harbor

Captain Peter Nicolay Skibsted (12 January 1787 – 18 April 1832) was a Danish naval officer with a successful career marred only by the loss in 1810 of a squadron of three gunboats under his command to the British.

== Birth ==
Born in Copenhagen on 12 January 1787, Peter Nicolay Skibsted was the son of the brewer and alderman, Andreas Skibsted. His father owned the property at Niels Hemmingsens Gade 32.

== Early career ==
Skibsted entered the Danish Navy in 1798 as a volunteer cadet; he formally enrolled as a cadet in 1799 at the age of 12. He was a good swimmer and his senior officer reported in July 1801 that he had completed a swim of 2880 alen (1800 meters in modern measurement) in 63 minutes.

In 1802 he received a promotion to junior lieutenant, which led to his service on Friderichssteen in the Danish West Indies in 1803 and 1804. From 1806 to late February 1808 Skibsted taught at the Naval Cadet Academy. He spent part of his time on Prinds Christian Frederik, a ship-of-the-line that was then serving also as a cadet training ship.

Skibsted interrupted his teaching in August and September 1807 with service as commander of the gunboat Holbæk at the defence of Copenhagen. (Note: After the British had defeated the Danes the British took Fredericksteen into service. British records show the gunboat Holbæk as having been surrendered and destroyed. However, Danish records have Holbek running aground in Norway with the Norwegians later recovering her and adding her to their gunboat squadrons.)

In 1808 Skibsted commanded the gunboat Nykøbing at Ulfshale, south of Copenhagen. On 9 December 1808 he was promoted to senior lieutenant.

== Assault ==
By 1809 Skibsted was commanding officer of a squadron of gunboats based at Korsør in the Great Belt. It was here that a local blacksmith, Knud Eskildsen, laid charges of assault against him. Reportedly, Skibsted struck the blacksmith, who had been extremely rude to him in the presence and hearing of many of Skibsted's crew. Although his senior officer reported that Peter Skibsted never lost his temper, and that the blacksmith was known to be a very impertinent fellow, the court found Skibsted guilty of unlawful and violent assault. In judgement, the court fined Skibsted one month’s pay – to be donated to the hospital for injured sailors – plus court costs.

== 1810 – success and failure ==
By 13 April 1810, Skibsted was stationed in the Kattegat. On that day, his four gunboats were escorting a small fleet of merchant ships from Udbyhøj at the mouth of Randers fjord southward to the island of Samsø when a British gunboat attack to raid the convoy. Skibsted initially concealed his gunboats behind the merchant ships. Then, when the British ship (which turned out to be Grinder) was close enough, the Danes were able to capture her after 90 minutes of hard rowing in the relatively windless air.

The press of Denmark, Germany, and Britain reported Skibsted's capture of Grinder, and it was to this achievement that Skibsted owed his appointment on 28 May 1810 as senior officer of a squadron of three newly completed armed luggers: Husaren, Løberen, and Flink. Senior Lieutenant N. H. Tuxen, who in the previous year had captured the brig Minx, became captain of Løberen. Acting Lieutenant Thaysen commanded Flink. Each lugger carried one long gun and four brass howitzers and had a crew of 28 men.

Skibsted decided to follow the safer route south and west from Copenhagen via Bøgestrøm, Svendborgsund, the Little Belt and Aarhus Bay to get the squadron safely to the hunting grounds of the Kattegat off eastern Jutland. Unfortunately, he encountered three British warships, Edgar, Dictator and Alonzo, which chased him into the harbor of Grenå.

Skibsted planned to load provisions and thereafter travel at night northwards, hugging the land. To protect his ships while they were at Grenå, he received the assistance of a company of troops who were in barracks there. The troops, together with some field guns, were stationed on shore nearby. However, before Skibsted could implement his plan to leave, a little after midnight 10 British boats, some equipped with carronades, and manned by some 200 sailors and marines attacked the Danish luggers.

The British heavily outnumbered the Danes, who were also not as experienced at close combat. As soon as the British came into sight, Skibsted brought his luggers as close to the shore as he could. Unfortunately, the luggers could not get near enough to land to be well-supported by the Danish soldiers. The British opened fire on the luggers with grape shot from the carronades and with small-arms fire, which the Danes could only return with their howitzers and small arms, as they were unable to bring the luggers’ guns to bear on the British boats.

The British came alongside the luggers, and now the Danish troops on shore had to check their fire for fear of hitting their own countrymen. The defenders on the three luggers were soon overwhelmed. Almost one third of the Danes were casualties in that six had been killed, and Tuxen and Thaysen, and 14 other men were wounded. The British losses were one dead and three wounded. Despite fire from Danish soldiers on the shore, the British refloated their prizes and took them out to where the ships of the line were anchored two miles away.

The Danish record agrees in its essential details with a letter in London Gazette from Captain Pointz of Edgar. Prize money was paid in 1812. (Note: The London Gazette report of 25 February 1812 makes two mistakes in the spelling of the captured ships' names and quotes the date of the battle incorrectly as occurring in September 1810 when all other evidence is that it took place on the 7 July 1810, with the climax in the very early hours of 8 July 1810.)

== After the battle ==
Lieutenant Skibsted was taken on board Edgar along with the other prisoners, some to be exchanged and some to be held as prisoners of war. On 19 July a decision was made by the (Danish) Admiralty that Skibsted should face a court martial on his return from captivity.

Skibsted arrived as a prisoner at Yarmouth on 7 August 1810, from where he was taken to Northampton. One year later, on 26 August 1811, he was released and returned to the Fredericksværn Naval Headquarters. After a few days service at Arendal he returned to Copenhagen to the court of inquiry into the loss of the three luggers. The court ordered that he receive a reprimand and pay court costs.

Six months later, on 2 April 1812, a royal decree released him from any threat of further action relating to the events at Grenå but still required him to repay the court costs. (Note: Topsøe's book records that full details are held in Danish Admiralty archives at reference I.S.Adm. 802/1812) Thereafter he served with the gunboat flotilla at Helsingør, where there may have been some degree of ill-feeling as Skibsted complained of being refused service at a restaurant in the town.

== Later career ==
- 1812 With the brig Bornholm
- 1813–1814 Again with the gunboat flotilla at Helsingør
- 1815 Recruitment officer at Helsingør, and promoted to lieutenant-captain in September of that year.
- 1818–1820 He was first lieutenant of Diana and sailed with her to the Danish West Indies
- 1822 In command of the guardship station at Trekroner, on the northern approaches to Copenhagen
- 1823 He commanded the brig Falster and was promoted to full captain

== Fate ==
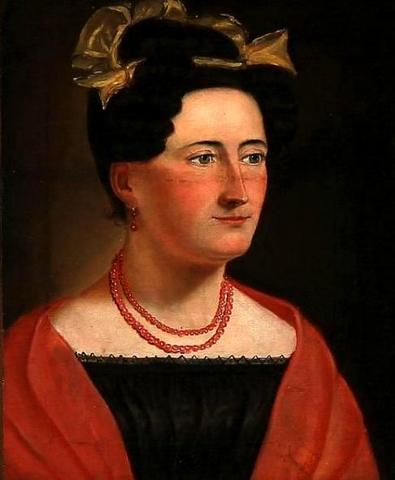
Skibsted's wife Ellen.

Peter Nicolay Skibsted died on 18 April 1832 in Copenhagen, and is buried in the churchyard of the Danish Naval Church ved Holmen. He had married Ellen Sophia Cathrina von Bergen, daughter of probérmesterat Kronborg Rifle Factory Georg Wilhelm von Bergen, in 1813. She continued to receive a pension until their three sons had been commissioned as naval officers, or had otherwise left the naval cadet corps.
