= Gråbrødretorv 4 =

Building in Copenhagen Municipality, Denmark

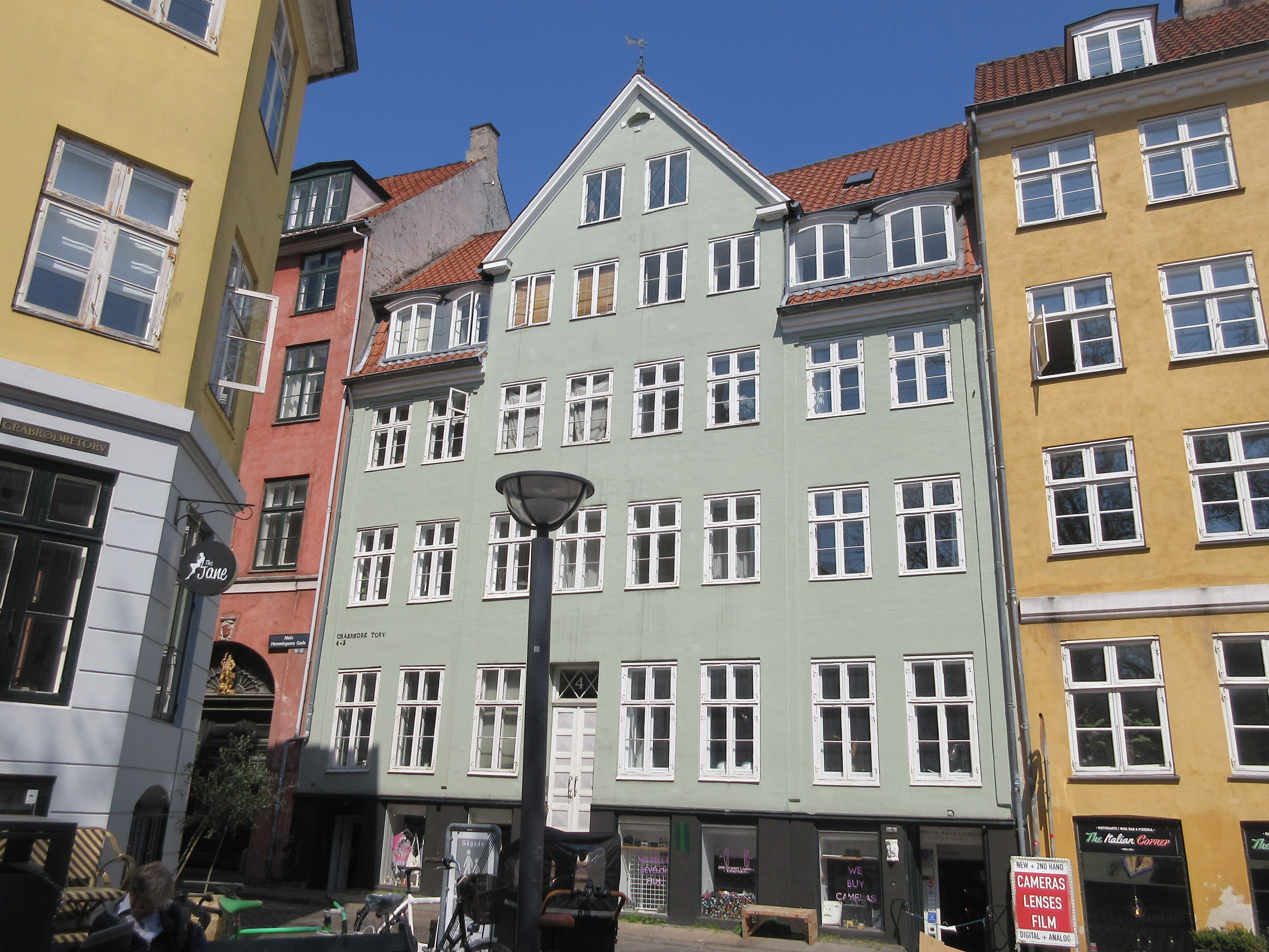
- Interactive map of the Gråbrødretorv 4 area

General information
- Architectural style: Neoclassical
- Location: Copenhagen, Denmark
- Coordinates: 55°40′48.61″N 12°34′34.79″E
- Completed: 1765

Grøbrødretorv 4 is a mid 18th-century residential property situated on the east side of Gråbrødretorv in the Old Town of Copenhagen, Denmark. The three-winged complex was listed in the Danish registry of protected buildings and places in 1918. Former residents include the actor Dirch Passer and the artist Bjørn Wiinblad. The latter has decorated the walls of the principal staircase with a series of murals.

== History ==
=== 18th century ===
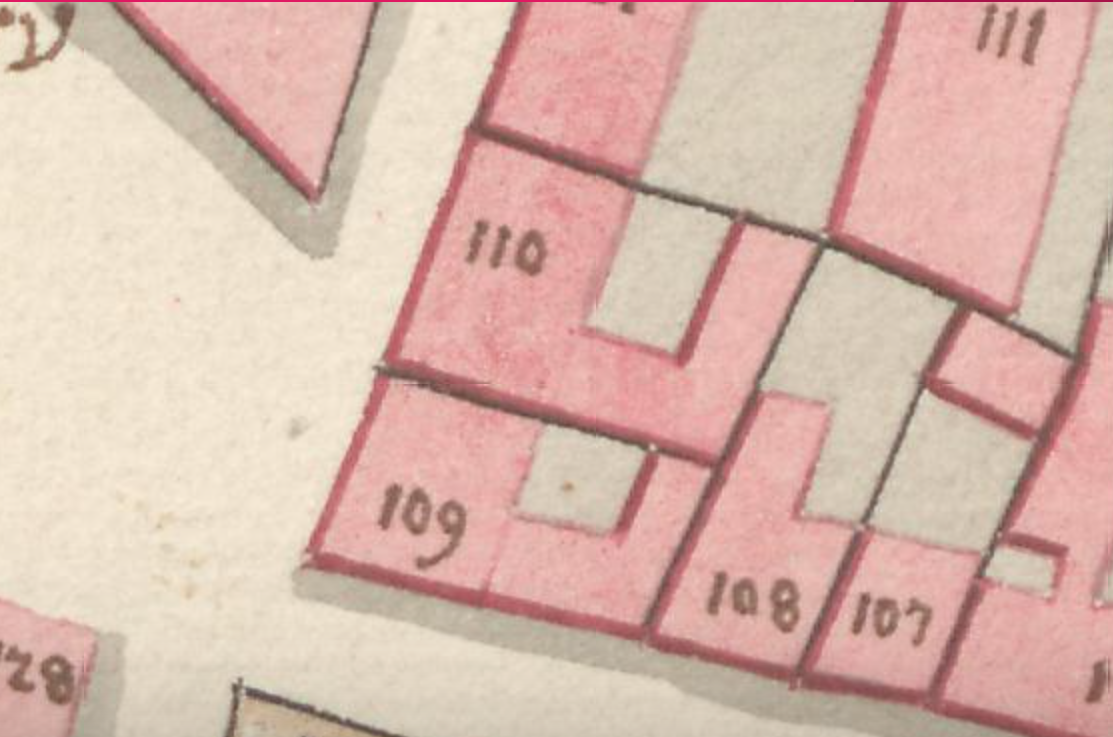
No. 110 seen on a detail from Christian Gedde's map of Frimand's Quarter, 1757.

The site was in 1689 part of a larger property, No. 122 in Frinamd's Quarter, owned by grocer (urtekræmmer) Herman Raben. The buildings at the site were destroyed in the Copenhagen Fire of 1728. The property was in 1756 as No. 110 owned by mason Niels Jensen. The current building was constructed in 1765 for police commissioner Thomas Bulle.

The property was at the time of the 1787 census home to a total of 60 people distributed on 12 households. Thomas Pedersen Balle, a commissioner, resided in the building with his Magrethe Elisabeth Swartzkopf, their 21-year-old daughter Rebecca Elisabeth Balle and one maid. Michael Green, a goldsmith, resided in the building with his wife Birgithe Marie Olsens, their three children (aged three to eight) and two apprentices. Andreas Landt, a bookdealer, resided in the building with his sister Barbara Landt, one maid and one lodger. Cathrina Matheæ Copsei, widow of surgeon Georg Kønig, resided in the building with the 59-year-old widow Johanne Ols Datter and her 12-year-old son Friderich Emanuel Petersen. Hans Jochum Bakhaus, a master tailor, resided in the building with his wife Fridericha Henriette Berg, three tailors and two apprentices. Søren Madsen Lund, another master tailor, resided in the building with his wife Kierstine Marie Branholt, their 12-year-old daughter, one tailor and one apprentice. Christian jensen Weyle, a beer vendor (øltapper) and shoemaker, resided in the building with his wife Marie Jacobs Datter and three lodgers. Jens Jespersen, a beer vendor (øltapper) and workman, resided in the building with his wife Abigael Niels Datter and their two children (aged 3 and 10). Daniel Henrich Bitterman, a shoemaker, resided in the building with his wife Anna Magrethe Boysen and their two children. Erland Nielsen Malm, a tailor, resided in the building with his wife Lovise Cathrine Willads, their four children (aged three to 12) and one lodger. Johan Johansen Boye, another tailor, resided in the building with his wife Dorthe Anders Datter and their two children (aged 21 and 26).

=== 18th century ===
No. 110 in Frimand's Quarter was at the time of the 1801 census home to a total of 59 people distributed on eight households. The property was owned by canvas merchant Niels Wahl. He lived there with his wife Anne Maria Hansen, their two daughters (aged 4 and 15) and two maids. His household comprised a total of 17 people. Another household consisted of the customs officer Magnus Biergdahl, his wife, their two children and a maid. The daughter Frederikke Louise Biergdahl (1790-1864) would later marry the painter Christian Ludvig Knutzen. The other households were those of a clerk in the Notarius Publicus' office (Johannes Christian Riisbrigh, four people in the household), a glovemaker (Christen Mortensen Has, six people in the household), a Pallbearer (Amund Floer, two people in the household), a workman (six people in the household), a workman (Christian Frederik Schakheit, six people in the household), a watchman (Carl Hense, four people in the household) and a master shoemaker (Johan Frederik Ibsen, 11 people in the house hold). The property was in the new cadastre of 1806 listed as No. 118. It was by then still owned by Niels Wahl.

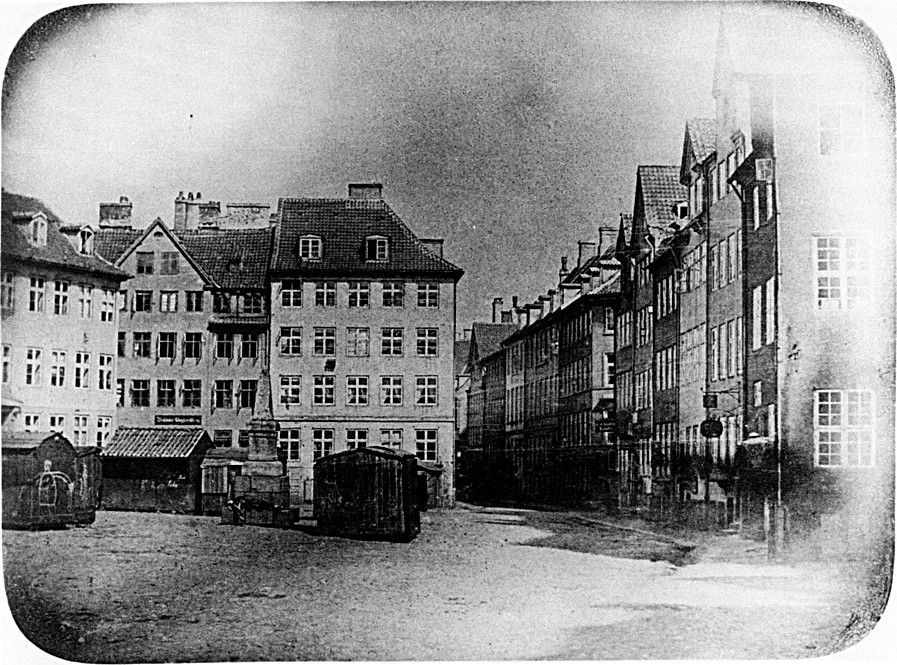
The building seen on Denmark's first daguerreotype by Peter Febar, 1840.

No. 118 was at the time of the 1840 census home to a total of 55 people distributed on eight households. Jacob Frederik Milo, a book-binder, resided with his wife, four children, anephew, two employees (one of them an apprentice) and a maid in one of the ground floor apartments. Andreas Christian Dahlgreen, a manufacturer of pewterware, resided in the other ground floor apartment with his two daughters (aged one and five), an apprentice and two maids. Christen Nielsen, a mailman, resided with his wife and daughter on the first floor. Johan Peter Jelling, a book binder, was residing with his wife Jacobine Bentine Rosenkrantz in the other first floor apartment. Cathrine Margrethe Belman, a 70-year-old widow midwife, resided with her unmarried daughter and a maid on the second floor. unmarried. Mette Kirstine Møller, a widow, resided with her four children and two lodgers in the other second floor apartment.

Ellen Marie Bergstrøm, a widow, resided with a lodger on the third floor. Anders Holst, a master shoemaker, resided with his wife, three children and a lodger in the basement. Jens Jørgensen, a tailor, was also residing with his wife, four children and a lodger in the basement. Johan Thomas Lorentz (no mention of occupation) and his wife Karen Malene Hjort was also residing in the basement. Jens Jørgensen, a joiner, resided in one of the dwellings in the rear wing with his wife, two children and a lodger. Hans Henrik Lange, a tanner, was residing with his wife in the other dwellings in the rear wing. Philip Abraham Levi, a Jewish trader, resided in the building with his wife Hanna Heimans Datter and their two children (aged 25 and 29).

=== 20th century ===
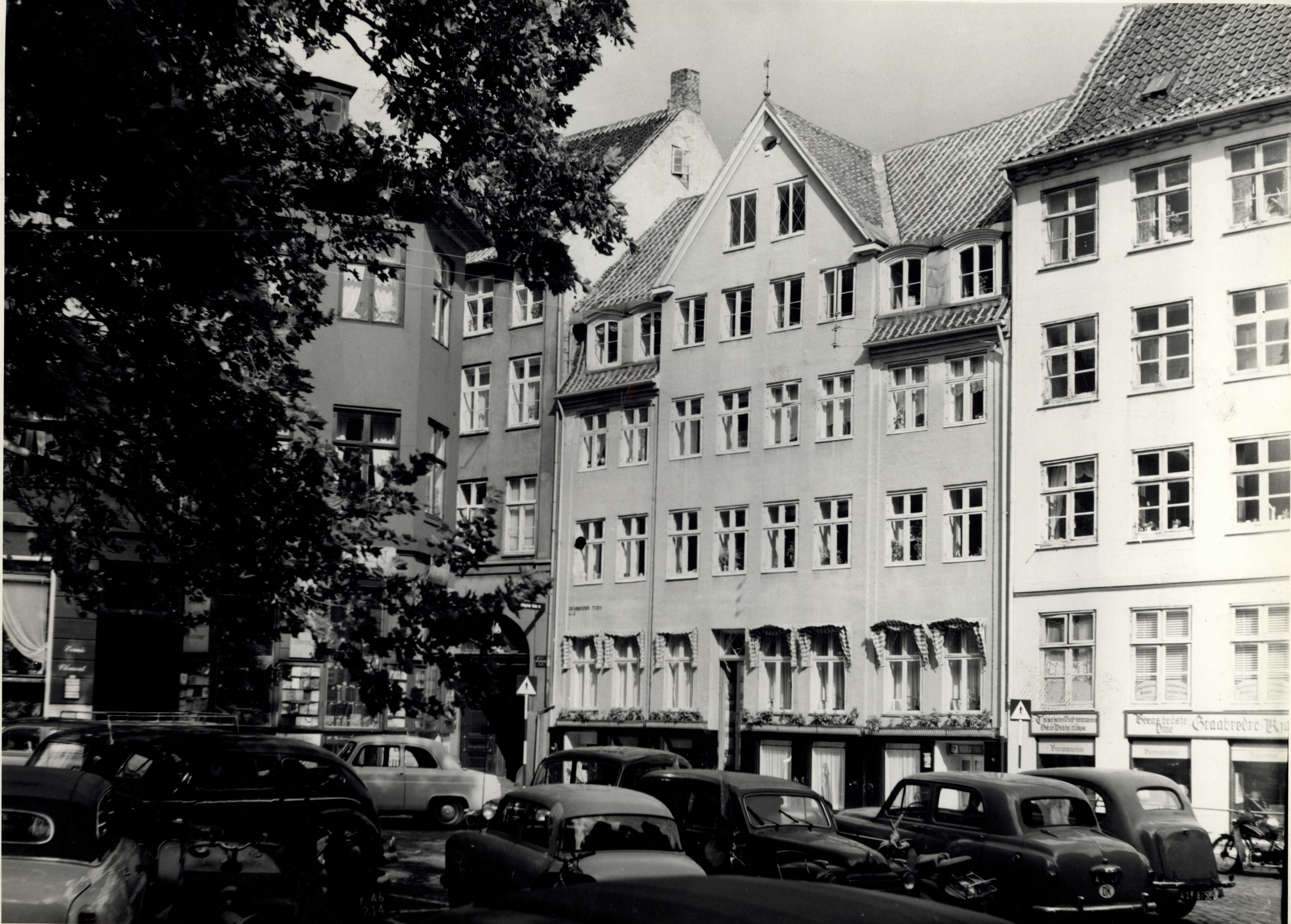
No. 4 on 16 September 1957,

The property was at the time of the 1906 census home to a total of 37 people. They included the actor Edmund Petersen.

The actors Dirch Passer and Judy Gringer resided in the apartment on the second floor to the right from 1858. The association had been founded in 1881. Passer came from an apartment on Amagerbrogade (No. 84, first floor) while Gringer had until then lived in Bagsværd. Gringer moved to an apartment at Bianco Lunos Allé 10 (fourth floor) when the couple divorced in 1963. Passer kept the apartment on Gråbrødretorv until 1968. His next home was a house at Rosbækvej 11 in Østerbro. The artist and designer Bjørn Wiinblad has also lived in the building. He lived in the apartment on the third floor to the right.

== Architecture ==
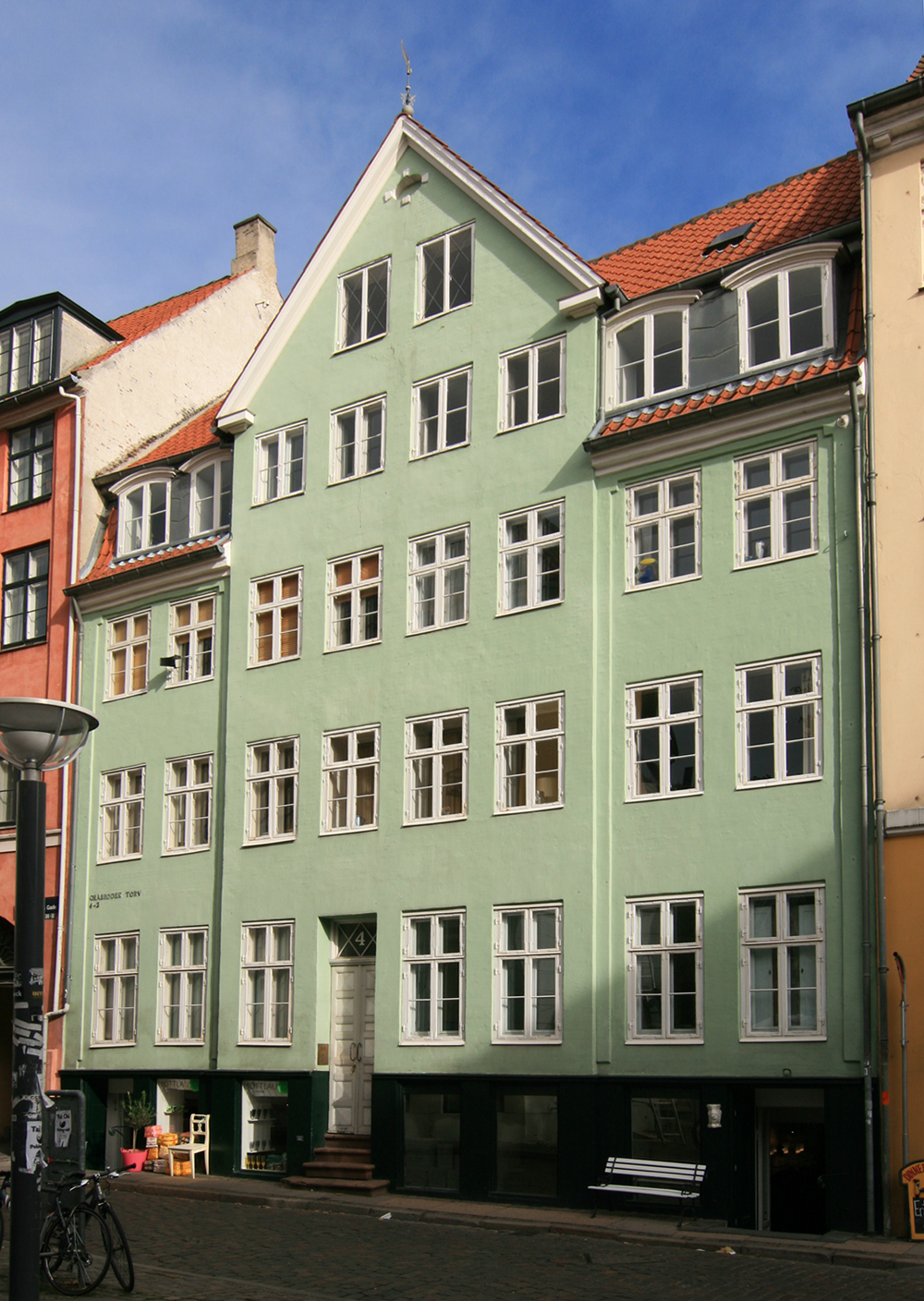
Gr¨br'dretprv 4-

Gråbrødretorv 4 is a three-winged complex, surrounding three sides of a central courtyard, constructed with a masonry front towards the street but apart from that with timber framing. The front wing is constructed with three storeys over a walk-out basement. The facade is rendered in a pale green colour, contrasted by the white window frames and a substantial white cornice. The slightly projecting four-bay median risalit is tipped by a through-going gabled wall dormer with cornice returns and an oval oculus. The two outer bays on each side of the median risalit are flanked by lesenes. The main entrance in the fourth bay from the left is accessed via a short flight of sandstone steps. The inset door is tipped by a large transom window. The Mansard roof is clad in red tile and features four dormer windows, two on each side of the gabled wall dormer.

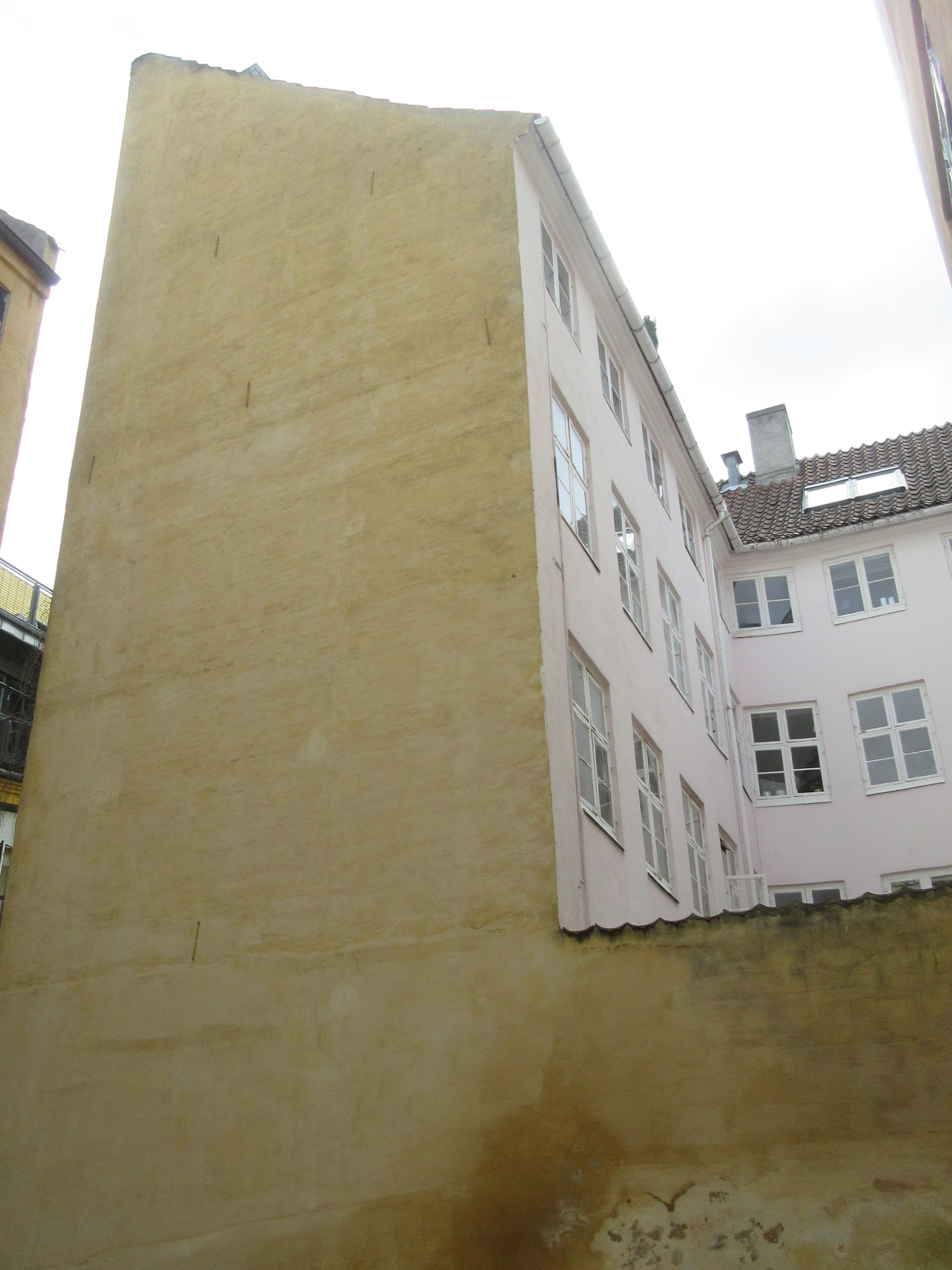
The perpendicular wing and the rear wing of Gråbrødretorv 4 viewed from the courtyard of Niels Hemmingsens Gade 32.

A three-bay perpendicular wing extends from the rear side of the building and is again attached two the five-bay rear wing at the bottom of the small courtyard. The courtyard is to the northwest separated from that of Niels Hemmingsens Gade 32 by a brick wall. The perpendicular wing and the rear wing are both constructed with four storeys over walk-out basements and have monopitched red tile roofs, both pierced by a substantial chimney. The exteriors walls of all three wings are towards the yard plastered and painted in a pale red colour. The green-painted door in the rear wing features a relief of a bull. The rear side of the rear wing faces the courtyard of Løvstræde 12.

The main entrance of the building opens to an anteroom which provides access to the building's principal staircase as well as to the courtyard via a direct door. A secondary staircase is located in the rear wing. Bjørn Wiinblad has decorated the walls of the principal staircase with a series of murals. A kitchen on the third floor is also finished with ceramic tiles created by him.

The entire complex was listed in the Danish registry of protected buildings and places on 23 December 1918.

== Today ==
Gråbrødretorv 4 is today owned by Ejerlejlighedsfor Gråbrødretorv 4. It contains a retail space in the basement. The front wing contains two condominiums on each of the upper floors with the exception that the ones on the second and third floor to the right have been merged into a single 194 sqm dwelling. The condominiums to the right continues through the perpendicular wing to the building's secondary staircase on some of the floors. A small third condominium is on these floors located in the rear wing to the left of the secondary staircase. The apartment to the right incorporates the entire rear wing on the remaining floors. The Mansard storey and garret has been converted into an extra condominium in more recent times.
