= HMS Grinder (1809) =

Gunboat of the Royal Navy

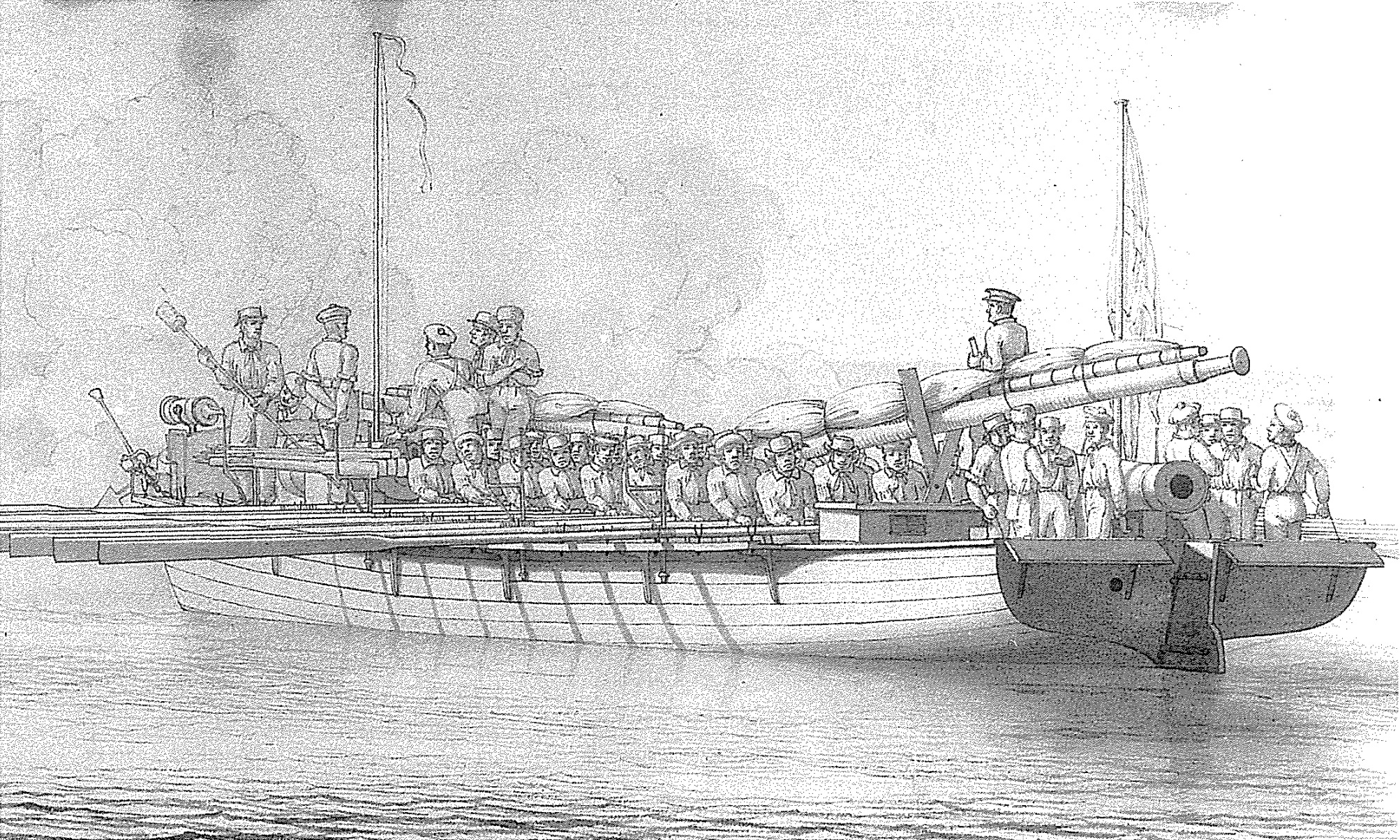
- A Danish gunboat similar in size and type to Grinder

History

United Kingdom
- Name: Grinder
- Builder: Unknown
- Captured: 13 April 1810 by Danish gunboats

Denmark—Norway
- Name: Prise No.5
- Acquired: 13 April 1810
- Captured: 5 July 1811 by HMS Sheldrake

United Kingdom
- Name: Grinder
- Fate: Sold 22 August 1832

General characteristics
- Tons burthen: 41 bm
- Complement: 34 (British service)
- Armament: British service - 2 × 24-pounder cannon; Danish service - 1 × 24-pounder cannon + 1 × 24-pounder carronade + 1 × 4-pounder howitzer

Grinder was a gunboat serving as a tender, rather than a commissioned warship, to HMS Anholt, the British garrison on the island of Anholt during the Gunboat War. Grinder's origins are obscure, but the Danes captured her in 1810 and the British recaptured her in 1811. (Note: Another ship named Grinder was also captured in 1810, but by a French privateer not the Dano-Norwegian navy. The sloop Favorite then recaptured this Grinder on 3 October 1810 and she was probably the merchant vessel referred to in the press in January 1811 arriving at Whitehaven - "The Grinder, Turner, loaded with a cargo of wool from Lisbon; taken by a French privateer but retaken by an English sloop of war and carried into Plymouth...") She was sold in 1832.

== Prelude - capture of Anholt ==
On 18 May 1809, the 74-gun third rate HMS Standard, under Captain Askew Hollis, led in a squadron that also included the frigate Owen Glendower, and the four smaller ships Avenger, Ranger, Rose, and Snipe. Together they captured the island. A landing party of seamen and marines under the command of Captain William Selby of Owen Glendower, with the assistance of Captain Edward Nicolls of the Standard's marines, landed. The Danish garrison of 170 men put up a sharp but ineffectual resistance that killed one British marine and wounded two; the garrison then surrendered. The British took immediate possession of the island.

== Tender to HMS Anholt ==
In 1810 Captain Nicolls, now Governor of Anholt, was concerned about reports of a Danish force gathering in Jutland to retake Anholt. He therefore ordered boats off Anholt to maintain a watch over Randers Fjord and Grenå whenever the wind was fair. To this end he re-launched "GB Grinder", which had overwintered on the island. Nicolls gave Grinder a crew made up of 30 seamen and marines from the island's garrison and captained by Master's Mate Thomas Hester. (Note: Danish and German sources, and English language sources based on these, name the captain as Lieutenant Thomas Ester or Esther. Neither of these names appears in British records as a commissioned officer. However, the muster book for HMS Anholt does list Master's Mate Thomas Hester.) Nicolls also assigned Grinder the mission of intercepting trade along the shore.

Grinder captured a Danish trading sloop "on the Swedish coast" on 17 March. On the following day Nicolls sent her "to look into the harbour of Harrup", where she discovered a number of small Danish trading vessels and proceeded to capture five of them "...in sight of the enemies flotilla of gunboats". (Note: Harrup may be the English rendering of the Danish place name Hurup, now marked on maps as Øster Hurup, on the east coast of Jutland. Many inner harbours on Jutland were still frozen in at mid-March 1810 and gunboat crews were often on winter leave during the period when the seas were frozen – so the gunboats seen may have been iced in or unmanned.) Reportedly, these six were among 12 merchantmen that Grinder had captured.

== Capture by the Danes, (1810) ==
On 13 April 1810 Grinder was pursuing two small ships when Senior Lieutenant Peter Nicolay Skibsted, who with four Danish gunboats was convoying eight transport ships from Udbyhøj (at the mouth of the Randers Fjord, Jutland) to Samsø, spotted her. He immediately concealed his gunboats behind the transports, thus tricking Grinder into drawing closer. As soon as Hester noticed the stratagem, he tried to escape, but Skibsted was successful in the next 90 minutes in rowing up to him, and after a few shots were exchanged, forcing Hester to surrender. The muster rolls for HMS Anholt record Hester and 27 men as "discharged - prisoner in Denmark" on 17 April 1810. One man was recorded as having died.

The Times reported that

"A Gottenburg mail has brought letters and papers to the 3rd inst. An article, under the date April 21, gives a long account of the capture of an English gun brig in the Baltic. This vessel had wintered at Anholt. Her loss was two men killed and two wounded. She proved to be the Grinder, Lieutenant Esher."

=== Danish service (21 April 1810 to 5 July 1811) ===
The Danes brought Grinder into Samsø where they repaired her battle damage. They renamed her Prise No.5, and Midshipman Oldelan then commissioned her on 21 April 1810; in Danish service she was armed with:

- One 24-pounder cannon
- One 24-pounder carronade and
- One 4-pounder howitzer.

On 23 June 1810 Prise No.5 sailed to Fladstrand (modern name Frederikshavn). There she joined the flotilla under Senior Lieutenant Falsen, which already included two large and two smaller gunboats, plus the captured Minx. Prise No.5 then moved to Skagen, (Northern Jutland) where on 4 and 5 August, a storm forced her aground. She was refloated and in December she sailed to Fladstrand, where she was laid up. From March 1811 Prise No.5 was based at Fladstrand.

== Recapture (1811) ==
The Danes record that on 5 July 1811 the British recaptured Prise No.5 between the islands of Hjelmen and Sejerø when the Fladstrand flotilla attacked a British convoy. On that day HMS Sheldrake was in company with the third rates Cressy, Defence, and Dictator, and the gun-brig Bruizer, with the British warships protecting a convoy of merchantmen. As they passed Hjelm Island a flotilla of 17 Dano-Norwegian gunboats and 10 rowboats came out to attack the convoy. The attackers lost four gunboats; the convoy had no losses. During the action, Sheldrake captured the Danish gunboats No. 2 and No. 5.

== Fate ==
While laid up at Sheerness, Grinder was offered for sale by the Admiralty on 24 July 1832, and sold on 22 August the same year.
