= Poul Skibsted =

Danish Supreme Court attorney and public prosecutor general

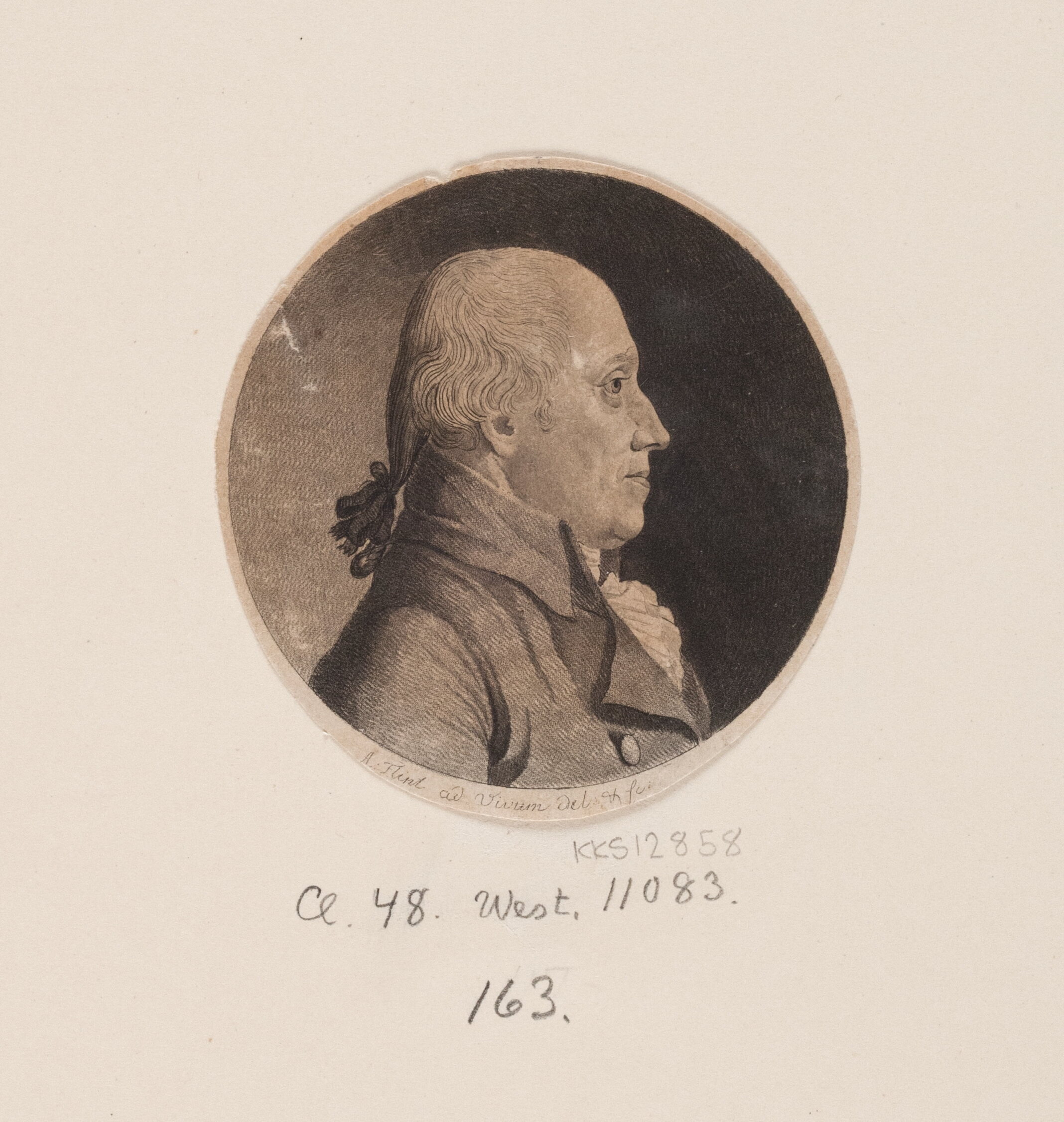
Poul Skibsted by Andreas Flint.

Poul Frederik (Povel Friderich) Skibsted (23 May 1753 – 21 September 1812) was a Danish Supreme Court attorney and public prosecutor general. He acted as prosecutor in the high-profile trials against Malthe Conrad Bruun and Peter Andreas Heiberg, which both resulted in them being exiled. He also functioned as director of the Danish Asiatic Company from 1789 to 1812. He was active in the time of Denmark-Norway.

== Early life and education ==
Skibsted was born in Copenhagen, the son of brewer and wholesale merchant Michael Skibsted (1699–1775) and Johanne Angelberg (1719–72). He grew up in his parents' property at Niels Hemmingsens Gade 32. He earned his Candidate of Law degree from the University of Copenhagen in 1774. The property and associated brewery was later taken over by his elder brother Andreas Skibsted (1752–1812).

== Career ==
Skibsted was already licensed as a Supreme Court attorney in 1775. His clients included many estate owners and leading merchant houses of the time. In 1789, he was appointed as public prosecutor general (generalfiscal). He acted as prosecutor in the high-profile trials against Malthe Conrad Bruun (for Aristokraternes Catechismus) and Peter Andreas Heiberg, which both resulted in them being exiled in 1800. He also acted as prosecutor in the trial against their publisher K. H. Seidelin. As of 1793, he was also associated Copenhagen Fire Insurance Company as a consultant (deliberationskommitteret).

He also functioned as director of the Danish Asiatic Company from 1789 to 1812.

== Written works ==
- Debut i bogform: Nødvendige erindringer angående det i Det danske asiatiske Compagnies general-forsamling d. 25. mai 1792 vedtagne tillæg til den nye conventions 2. § (1792)
- Debut i bogform: Denne gang og aldrig meer eller den 9de september venskabelig besunget 10de gang 1798, da poeten tager afskeed (1798)

== Personal life ==
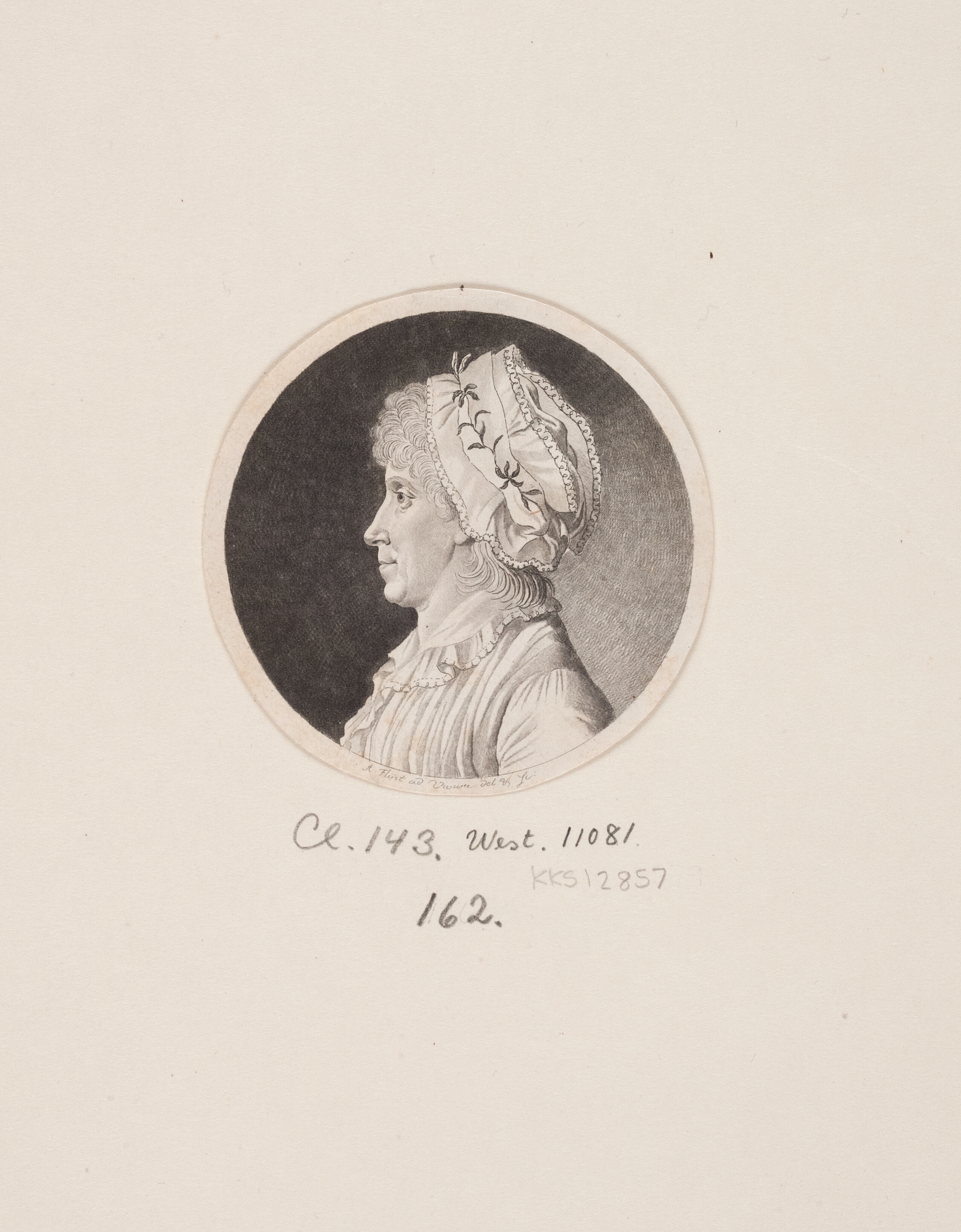
Christina Magdalene Skibsted by Andreas Flint.

On 5 May 1779 in Trinitatis Church, he married Christina Magdalena de Fine Olivarius (1756–1817), daughter of Kurantbanken bookkeeper Arnoldus de Fine Olivarius (1718–1804) and Pauline Susanne Marie Baumann (1726–99).

They had four children. Their son Arnoldus Fine Skibsted (1785–1851) became a Councillor of Justice. He married Agatha Johanne Lovise Charlotte Haxthausen (1789–1846), daughter of chamberlain Christian Frederik Haxthausen and courtier of hereditary princess Ide Margrethe Knuth Christiansdal. Their daughter Johanne Susanne Skibsted (1780–1804) married landowner Charles Adolph Denys Mourier, son of Pierre Paul Ferdinand Mourier and Elizabeth Cornelie Courtonne. Her younger sister Micheline Arnoldine Skibsted (1783–1847) married Carl Ludvig Zinn, son of the businessman Johann Ludvig Zinn and Johanna Charlotte Sophia Preisler. Their third daughter Marie Margrethe Skibsted (1787–1878) married the naval officer Hans Christian Sneedorff.

== See also ==
- Christian Klingberg
- Poul Sporon
