= HMS Alonzo =

Sloop of the Royal Navy

History

Great Britain
- Name: Alonzo
- Owner: Brown
- Launched: 1800, Shields
- Fate: Sold 1801

United Kingdom
- Name: HMS Alonzo
- Acquired: 1801 by purchase
- Fate: Scuttled 1842

General characteristics
- Tons burthen: 384 (bm)
- Length: 102 ft 3 in (31.2 m) (overall); 81 ft 1 in (24.7 m) (keel)
- Beam: 29 ft 10 in (9.1 m)
- Propulsion: Sail
- Sail plan: Sloop
- Complement: 100
- Armament: 2 × 18-pounder + 14 × 24-pounder carronades
- Notes: Coppered 1800

HMS Alonzo was a ship launched at Shields in 1800 that the British Royal Navy purchased in 1801. During the Napoleonic Wars she served in the Channel and the Baltic. At the end of the war she served as a hulk in various capacities prior to being scuttled off Leith in 1842.

== Mercantile origins ==
Alonzo entered Lloyd's Register in 1801 with J. Gardner, master, and Brown, owner. Her trade was London-Jamaica. Later that year the Royal Navy purchased her. 373 tons bm

== HMS Alonzo ==
The Navy purchased Alonzo from John Dudman on 8 February 1801. She then underwent fitting at Deptford until 25 March.

Commander Robert Cathcart commissioned her in February for the Downs. Commander Hassard Stackpole replaced Cathcart before, in May 1802, Commander W. H. Falknor (or Faulknor) replaced him in turn. On 31 October Alonzo arrived at Portsmouth from Jersey with stores from Pomone, which had wrecked there. On 30 November Alonzo sailed to "open a rendezvous at Dublin, for the entry of seamen."

In June 1803 Faulkner recommissioned Alonzo for service at Dublin for recruitment and impressement.

In October 1803 Commander John Impey was in command. That month, Alonzo was off Bognor when a three-day long gale resulted in her losing her masts and rudder, springing a dangerous leak, and coming close to being lost. Midshipman James Hervey Price managed to get ashore with dispatches on the third day and convey them to a signal station, which transmitted news of Alonzo's plight to Portsmouth.

Then on 10 March 1804 Alonzo came into Portsmouth. A few days earlier she had been driven aground at Chichester Park but assistance from the dockyard had gotten her off. At Portsmouth she was to undergo repairs for the damage she had received. On 2 April Alonzo sailed from Deal with a British squadron that was to escort some "stone ship' to Boulogne where they were to be scuttled to block the harbour. The attempt was abandoned and most of the squadron was back at Dungeness two or three days later.

On 12 June 1804 Alonzo returned to Portsmouth from Selsey where she had been serving as a guard ship.

In July 1804 Commander James Watson replaced Impey, with Alonzo serving on the Downs station.

Between May and August 1808 she was at Chatham undergoing fitting as a defence ship for Gibraltar. In May Commander Cuthbert Featherstone Daly recommissioned her, but in June Commander William Buckley Hunt replaced Daly, and in July William Knight replaced Hunt.

Alonzo never sailed to Gibraltar. Instead, she next underwent fitting, between August and April 1809, for service in the Baltic. In April 1809 Commander Edward Barker recommissioned her.

In 1809 the ship James, Gregg, master, ran aground in the Great Belt whilst on a voyage from Liverpool, Lancashire to Stockholm, Sweden. Alonzo sent in her boats to set fire to James to prevent Danish gunboats capturing her.

In early July 1810, during the Gunboat War with Denmark-Norway, HMS Dictator, in company with Alonzo and Edgar, sighted three Danish gunboats. The gunboats (Husaren, Løberen, and Flink) sought refuge in Grenå, on eastern Jutland, where a company of soldiers and their field guns could provide cover. However, the British mounted a cutting out expedition of some 200 men in ten ships’ boats after midnight on 7 July, capturing the three gunboats.

On 9 July Alonzo recaptured Jusfrow Frederica.

Between April and May 1810 Alonzo was at Northfleet undergoing repairs.

Alonzo, Gorgon, Victory, and the gun-brig Martial shared in the proceeds of the capture on 24 October 1810 of the brig Hoppet. (Note: The prize money for an ordinary seaman was 8s 2¼d; a captain received £51 3s 6d.)

In November 1810 Commander James Veitch recommissioned Alonzo for the Channel Islands. He received promotion to post-captain on 12 August 1812.

In September 1812, Commander John Baily (or Bally, or Bailey), replaced Veitch. On 6 December 1813 Commander Thomas Dutton replaced Bailey.

== Post-war ==
Alonzo was placed in ordinary at Deptford in 1814. Dutton remained at Plymouth after the end of the war on a three-year term of service with the Ordinary.

Between September and March 1815 Alonzo was at Woolwich undergoing fitting for service as a hospital ship for convicts. She served in that role between 1817 and 1822. In October 1828 Alonzo was recorded as serving as a convict ship at Portsmouth. Between May and August 1835 she underwent fitting as a chapel ship. The Navy lent her to the Leith Seamen's Society between 1835 and 1840.

== Fate ==
In February 1842 Alonzo was scuttled outside Leith harbour at 56°0′0″N 3°10′0″W.
