= Infantry Regiment "Asturias" No. 31 =

Spanish military unit

Coat of arms of the Infantry Regiment "Asturias" No. 31

The Infantry Regiment "Asturias" No. 31 (Spanish: Regimiento de Infantería "Asturias" nº 31") is a mechanized infantry unit in the Spanish Army.

It is also known as El Cangrejo ("The Crab"), name which features on its regimental coat of arms, and which it was given following the 1793–1795 campaign in Roussillon, during which it never retreated.

== History ==
The unit was raised on 3 February 1663 by the Junta General in the Kingdom of Asturias as the Tercio de Asturias, (Note: A tercio was a military unit of the Spanish Army during the reigns of the Catholic Monarchs and the Spanish Habsburgs (1469–1714). Each tercio was initially made up of ten companies of 300 soldiers each led by captains, although the companies were later reduced to 250 men each.) following the order from Felipe IV to raise troops for the war against Portugal. (Note: "Quinientos Infantes desnudos para guerra contra el rebelde de Portugal".) The uniforms and arms would be paid for from the king's coffers, while the Principality would have to contribute five thousand [gold] escudos, to be raised by a tax on salt.

The following March, its 53 officers and 470 soldiers, under maestre de campo, Sancho de Miranda y Ponce de León, were sent to Galicia, where it was garrisoned, attached to the Spanish Navy, until 1669.

The unit was raised a second time in 1691 and sent to defend Catalonia against a French invasion and was then stationed at Olot, under the command of Francisco Menéndez de Avilés y Porres. This unit was active until, at least, 1697.

The unit was raised a third time, during the War of the Spanish Succession (1701 to 1715), to further the Bourbon cause and, on 6 July 1703, the command was given to the 18-year-old Álvaro de Navia-Osorio y Vigil, Viscount of Puerto de Vega and future 3rd Marquis de Santa Cruz de Marcenado.

In 1732 it took part in the conquest of Oran. In 1744, in the War of the Austrian Succession it was sent to Italy, where it fought at the Battle of Francavilla, and in 1761 it was sent to Cartagena de Indias. The unit was then garrisoned at La Habana (1771–1774), at Veracruz (1776–1784) and at Orán (1789–1791).

In 1800 it took part in repelling the British expedition at Ferrol.

In 1807 the Asturias Regiment was sent to the north of Europe as part of the Spanish expeditionary force, the Division of the North, made up of fourteen battalions of infantry and five regiments of cavalry, commanded by Marquis de la Romana. Then numbering 2,103 men (excluding officers), the Asturias Regiment was the largest Spanish regiment quartered in Denmark and the only one that was almost up to the full number of 2,186 bayonets.

When the Peninsular War broke out, in May 1808, La Romana made plans with the British to repatriate his men to Spain.

However, at the end of July, when the regiments of Asturias and Guadalajara (2,069 men) were told that they had to swear allegiance to King Joseph, they mutinied and killed the aide-de-camp of General Fririon, who was presiding at the ceremony. The following day, 1 August, they were forced to surrender, disarmed, and put in confinement.

In May 1809, the only high-ranking officer that had refused to participate in La Romana's plot, General Kindelan, La Romana's second-in-command, was put in charge of raising the Joseph Napoleon's Regiment from among the Spanish prisoners.

Although the Asturias Regiment was dissolved when it refused to swear allegiance to the Emperor, (Note: According to Oman (1902), they had earlier refused to swear allegiance to King Joseph.) it was raised again in 1811, seeing action throughout the rest of the Peninsular War.
