= Stakesby =

Stakesby may refer to -

== People ==
- Henrietta Stakesby Lewis (1850–1912), South African temperance leader

== Places ==
- Stakesby, North Yorkshire
- High Stakesby, North Yorkshire

== Ships ==
- SS Stakesby, a number of ships with this name
- Stakesby (1814 ship) – launched at Whitby and foundered 1846
