= HMS Salsette (1805) =

Frigate of the Royal Navy

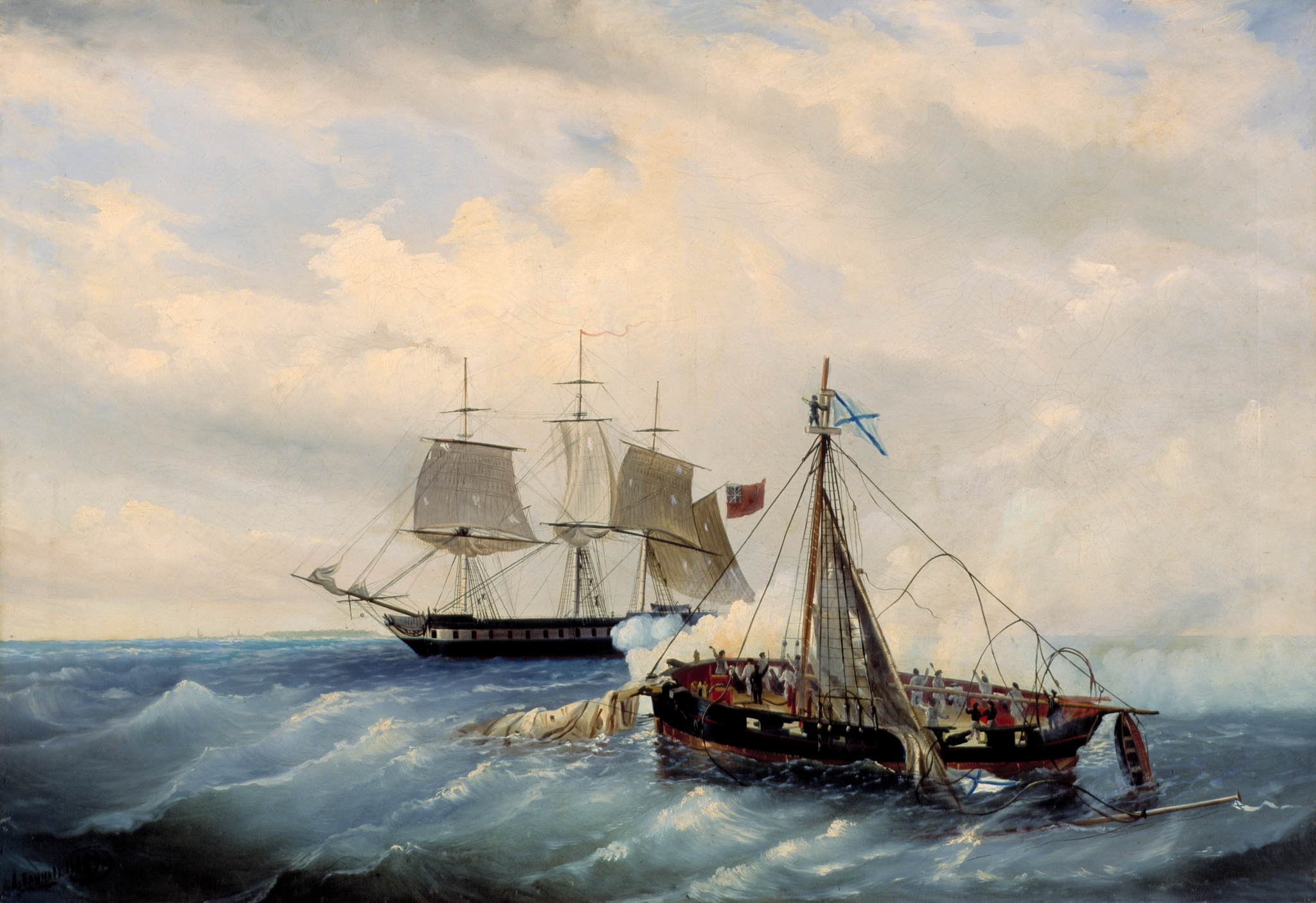

History

United Kingdom
- Name: HMS Salsette
- Ordered: 12 May 1802
- Builder: Bombay Dockyard, M/Shipwright Jamsetjee Bomanjee
- Laid down: 19 July 1803
- Launched: 17 January 1805
- Fate: Broken up 20 March 1874

General characteristics
- Class & type: Perseverance-class fifth-rate frigate
- Tons burthen: 90182/94 (bm)
- Length: 137 ft 0 in (41.8 m) (overall); 112 ft 11 in (34.4 m) (keel)
- Beam: 38 ft 9 in (11.8 m)
- Depth of hold: 13 ft 7 in (4.1 m)
- Propulsion: Sails
- Complement: 260
- Armament: UD:26 × 18-pounder guns; QD: 2 × 9-pounder guns + 10 × 32-pounder carronades; Fc:2 × 9-pounder bow guns + 2 × 32-pounder carronades

HMS Salsette (or Salcette) was a Perseverance-class fifth-rate frigate of a nominal 36 guns, launched in 1805. The East India Company built her for the Royal Navy at the company's dockyards in Bombay. She was the Navy's first teak-built ship.

She served in the Indies, the Baltic, the Mediterranean and the Home Station, taking several prizes and seeing a limited amount of action. She did participate in a single-ship action in the Baltic that was notable for the other, much smaller, vessel's heroism. Salsette was laid up after the end of the Napoleonic Wars but then went on to serve in a number of support functions until the Admiralty had her broken up in 1874.

== Naming ==
Built and launched as HMS Pitt, she was renamed to Salsette on 19 February 1807. She is not to be confused with her sister ship Doris, which was named Salsette prior to her acquisition by the Royal Navy, which renamed her Pitt. This Pitt became Doris on 26 October 1807. For a while the Navy had two frigates with the same name.

Salsette received her name from Salsette Island in Maharashtra state on India's west coast. The metropolis of Bombay and the city of Thane lie on this island.

== Construction ==
Salsette was the first vessel the Bombay Dockyard built for the Royal Navy. As such, there were apparently many defects in her construction, which led the Navy to demand that the dockyard stick more closely to the design plans in the future.

== Initial service ==
In 1805 the Royal Navy commissioned Salsette (as Pitt) at Bombay under Captain Walter Bathurst for the East Indies and she participated in the blockade of Mauritius in 1805–6.

On 20 or 26 January Salsette chased a French prize and suffered one man killed and extensive damage to her hull by cannon fire from a fort on Pointe aux Cannoniere.

In 1806 she came under the command of Captain James Giles Vashon. In February 1807 Captain George Waldegrave assumed command. Salsette left Madras on 29 September 1807 and arrived in Portsmouth in early 1808, having brought with her Lord William Bentinck, the late governor of Madras. At Portsmouth she underwent repairs from January 1808 to 17 March and then sailed to the Baltic.

=== Baltic ===
Salsette was in the Baltic during the Gunboat War and the Anglo-Russian War (1807-1812). During this time she was again under the command of Captain Walter Bathurst.

On 30 April 1808, Salsette captured a Danish privateer after a chase of five hours off Moen island. The privateer was the Krathesminde (or Kratbesminde), She had left Copenhagen five days previously but had made no captures. She was armed with eight guns and she had a crew of 31 men, under the command of her master Christian Oxholm. On 21 May Salsette captured a sloop of unknown name. That same month Salsette also shared with Lynx in the capture of a schuyt.

On 2 June Salsette and Magnet, together with the boats of Centaur and Implacable, captured four Russian vessels that were carrying corn. They also captured the boat Humbug. Three days later Salsette and Centaur captured Johanna.

On 23 June Bathurst and Salsette chased a Russian sloop-of-war to Reval. He did not capture her, but he did capture a galliot anchored outside the port. As Bathurst was securing the prize, lookouts spotted a Russian cutter off Norgen island, which defends Reval from the sea.

Salsette set out in pursuit and eventually captured the cutter after having lost one man killed in a four-hour running fight. The cutter turned out to be the Opyt (aka Apith), armed with fourteen 12-pounder carronades and carrying a crew of 63 men. In the pursuit and engagement the cutter had lost four men killed and eight wounded, including her commander, before she struck. When her commander, Lieutenant Gavril C. Nevelskoy (also Novelski), tendered his sword, Bathurst returned it to him in recognition of his and his crew's heroic resistance. Bathurst then landed all the survivors near Libawa. The British took Opyt into service as Baltic.

On 20 August Salsette joined the British fleet under Vice-Admiral Sir James Saumarez, which was blockading Rager Vik (Ragerswik or Rogerswick or Russian: Baltiyskiy) where the Russian fleet was sheltering after the British 74-gun third rates Implacable and Centaur had destroyed the Russian 74-gun Vsevolod. Baltic's initial task was to land the prisoners that Implacable had taken from Vsevolod.

Saumarez wanted to attack the fleet and ordered Baltic and Erebus to be prepared as fireships. However, reconnaissance by Salsette, among other vessels, revealed that the Russians had stretched a chain across the entrance to the harbor, precluding an attack by fireships. Saumarez then abandoned the plan.

During the winter of 1808–09, Salsette was escorting a convoy of some 12 merchantmen, together with Magnet, Fama, Salorman and two Swedish naval vessels, when ice in the Baltic trapped the convoy. Most of the vessels, save Salsette, were lost, and Salsette herself could not return to port for some two months. Salsette's first Lieutenant at the time, Lieutenant Henderson, many years later wrote to Jamsetjee Bomanjee reporting that she had survived due to the quality of her teak hull. In June 1819 he was in Bombay as captain of the merchant ship Stakesby and presented Bomanjee with a small clock as a token of appreciation.

== Continuing active service ==
On 29 July 1809 Salsette escorted the vessels carrying the troops of Lieutenant-General Sir John Hope across the Channel where they were to participate in the Walcheren Expedition. She herself carried the left wing of the 28th Regiment of Foot. In the Stone Deeps Rear Admiral Sir Richard Keats boarded Salsette. Then Sir Home Popham in HMS Sabrina led the division to the Roompot.

In 1810 Salsette sailed to Malta. On the way she captured a French brig off the island of Marettimo. She then proceeded to Smyrna, where Lord Byron cadged a ride to Constantinople. While she was at the Dardanelles, on 3 May a Lieutenant William Ekenhead of her Marines and Lord Byron swam the Hellespont from Sestos to Abydos, that is, from the European to the Asian side. (Note: Not long after this feat, Ekenhead was swept from Salsette's deck and drowned near Malta. As a result, he never saw his name immortalized in the second canto of Don Juan. Other accounts report that when Salsette reached Malta Ekenhead received a promotion to Captain, got drunk, and fell to his death from a bridge at Valletta.) Although the Hellespont at that point was only about a mile wide, strong currents forced the two swimmers to cover about four miles, which took them both a little more than an hour.

Salsette sailed from Constantinople to Toulon to join the blockade there, and then in November to Malta where Bathurst removed to the 74-gun Fame and Captain Henry Montressor took command of Salsette. His successors included William Bertie (who drowned in December 1810), Commander John Hollingsworth, and in 1811, Captain Henry Hope.

On 29 June 1811 she captured the slaver Expedition off Mauritius. The prize crew took the ship and the slaves on her to the Portuguese colony of Goa because selling slaves was illegal in British India, but not in Goa. Salsette shared the prize money with the crews of Drake and Cornwallis.

On 21 April 1812, Salsette captured the French privateer Comète in the Mediterranean. She carried two 18-pounder guns and had a crew of 45 men. The head money (a per head bounty for each of the 45 men captured) was not paid until 1831.

In September Salsette was at Smyrna where she took on board the explorer and antiquarian William Ouseley. They sailed back to Britain via the Greek isles, Toulon, and Alicante.

Then on 14 October 1812 Salsette captured the three-masted lugger Mercure off the Isle of Wight. (Note: Ouseley reports that she was the former Marie Louise of Cherbourg.) This vessel carried 16 guns and had a crew of 70, and Salsette took her into Portsmouth.

In December 1812 Captain John Bowen assumed command and on 25 April 1813 Salsette proceeded to Madras, convoying East Indiamen sailing there. In May 1814 she unsuccessfully pursued the American privateer Hyder Ally, which Owen Glendower captured a few days later. On 27 November 1814 Salsette saved the Cornwallis, of Calcutta. A severe gale had dis-masted Cornwallis and Salsette had brought her into Trincomalee. The Vice Admiralty Court awarded Salsette 7.5% of the value of the vessel and her cargo, which were estimated at upwards of £90,000 sterling. (Note: A first-class share of the prize money was £1405 12s 1d, and an eighth-class share, which would accrue to a ship's boy, was £2 18s.)

In 1816 Salsette escorted a convoy back to Britain. On 12 May, Salsette stopped at St Helena en route, which gave Bowen the opportunity to be presented to the Emperor Napoleon. She arrived in Plymouth in June 1816 to pay off.

== Post-war career and fate ==
Salsette was laid up at Portsmouth. The Admiralty had her housed over in November 1823 but she remained there in ordinary. In July 1831 she was fitted as a lazaretto for Hull. In October 1835 she was fitted as a receiving ship at Woolwich. On 7 September 1869 the Admiralty ordered her moved to Sheerness. Salsette was broken up on 20 March 1874 at Chatham.
