= Stakesby (1814 ship) =

History

United Kingdom
- Name: Stakesby
- Owner: 1814:Henry Simpson, and Edward and W. S. Chapman; 1825:Edward and W. Chapman; 1831:Aaron Chapman (managing owner)
- Builder: W.S. Chapman, Whitby
- Launched: June 1814
- Fate: Foundered 1846

General characteristics
- Tons burthen: 450, or 437, or 43777/94 (bm)
- Length: 111 ft 9 in (34.1 m)
- Beam: 30 ft 1 in (9.2 m)
- Armament: 2 × 6-pounder guns

Stakesby was launched at Whitby in 1814. She carried immigrants to Quebec, traded with Batavia and Bombay, transported convicts to Van Diemen's Land, and made a voyage to Calcutta for the British East India Company (EIC). She disappeared in 1846 on a voyage from London to Quebec.

== Career ==
Stakesby first appeared in the Register of Shipping (RS) in 1815 with Pocock, master, changing to Gransmore, Chapman, owner, and trade Whitby–Baltic, changing to London–Jamaica.

On 24 September 1816 Stakesby, Gransmore, master, was returning from Jamaica when she ran aground at South Sand Head. The next day some boats from Deal, Kent, helped her get off; she had lost an anchor and some cables. She arrived at Gravesend on 1 October.

In July 1818 Stakesby, Wheatley, master, from London to Petersburg, ran on shore on Saltholm, Denmark, at the end of August, but was got off with assistance and proceeded. She arrived back from Petersburg on 3 November.

In 1813 the EIC had lost its monopoly on the trade between India and Britain. British ships were then free to sail to India or the Indian Ocean under a license from the EIC.

On 8 February 1819 Stakesby, Henderson, master, sailed from Gravesend, bound for Bombay. She arrived at Bombay on 1 June. On 14 June Henderson presented Jamsetjee Bomanjee with a small clock as a token of appreciation. Henderson had been first Lieutenant of HMS Salsette during the winter of 1808–09. Salsette had been escorting a convoy of some 12 merchantmen, together with Magnet, Fama, Salorman, and two Swedish naval vessels, when ice in the Baltic trapped the convoy. Most of the vessels, save Salsette, were lost, and Salsette herself could not return to port for some two months. Bomanjee had built Salsette of teak at the Bombay Dockyard and Henderson attributed her survival to the quality of her construction. Stakesby sailed from Bombay on 9 July and arrived back at Gravesend on 12 November.

Stakesby, Henderson, master, sailed from Gravesend on 5 July 1820, bound for Batavia. She arrived at Batavia on 17 November. On 17 March 1821 she sailed from Batavia and reached the Cape on 2 May. She arrived back at Deal on 31 July. Her master was now Smith.

Immigrants to Quebec (1823): In 1823 Stakesby, Johnson, master, carried 291 assisted immigrants from Cork to Quebec under a scheme organized by Peter Robinson. Stakesby left Cork on 8 July 1823 and arrived at Quebec on 2 September.

On 8 August 1825 Stakesby, Corner, master, ran down and sank Friendship, Nicholson, master, in the English Channel off Hythe, Kent. Her crew were rescued. She was on a voyage from South Shields, County Durham, to Jersey. Stakesby was on her way to Miramichi.

In 1829 Stakesby's owners transferred her registry to London.

EIC voyage (1830–1831): Captain Thomas Johnson sailed Stakesby from the Downs on 7 June 1830, bound for Bengal. She arrived at Calcutta on 10 November. Homeward bound, she was at Saugor on 2 February 1831, reached Saint Helena on 27 April, and arrived at her moorings in England on 27 June.

Convict transport to Van Diemen's Land (1833): In 1833 Stakesby, Miles Corner, master, transported convicts to Van Diemen's Land. She sailed from Spithead on 22 May 1833 and arrived at Hobart on 4 September. She had embarked 216 male convicts and she had suffered no convict deaths on her voyage.

Year	Master	Owner	Trade	Source
1835	M. Corner (Note: Captain Miles Corner died at Macao on 2 August 1834 from a fever he had contracted at Bali.) Front Cover Wm. H. Allen & Company, 1835	Chapman	London	Lloyd's Register (LR)
1840	Goble	Chapman	London–Quebec	LR
1845	Richards	Chapman	London–Quebec	LR

Mentions of Stakesby during the 1835–1840 period suggest that she served the British government as a transport. In early October 1836, Stakesby, Lieutenant Ward, commander, arrived at Portsmouth. She had left Halifax, Nova Scotia, on 20 August with part of the 1st Battalion of The Rifles. From Portsmouth she was to proceed to Chatham to disembark them. The regiment's commander and headquarters was expected to arrive shortly on Katherine Stewart Forbes.

On 10 June 1837 there was a report that the transport Stakesby, with a detachment of the 43rd Regiment of Foot, had gone onshore at the Old Head of Kinsale.

In 1839 Stakesby stopped at The Brazils on her way to deliver stores to Saint Helena and marines to Ascension Island.

== Fate ==
Stakesby disappeared in 1846 while sailing from London to Quebec. LR for 1846 showed her with Richards, master, Chapman, owner, and trade London–Quebec. The entry carries the annotation "Missing".
