= James Robertson (monk) =

Dom James Robertson OSB (1758–1820) was a Scottish Benedictine monk and the intelligence agent during the Napoleonic Wars responsible for the evacuation of La Romana's division.

Educated at Dinant and Regensburg, took solemn vows as a monk in 1778 and ordained in 1782. He published the first Catholic version of the New Testament to be printed in Scotland in 1792.

In 1808, disguised as a cigar merchant, he made secret contact with the Spanish general, Marqués de la Romana and a plan was worked out by which his 10,000 soldiers were secretly removed from Danish territory by the Royal Navy and returned to Spain to join the war against Napoleon. He subsequently published his own account of this mission: Narrative of a Secret Mission to the Danish Islands in 1808.
