= SS Stakesby =

Three steamships operated by Rowland & Marwood Ltd, Whitby were named Stakesby:

- SS Stakesby (1880), in service 1886–91, when sold
- SS Stakesby (1922), in service until 1929, when sold to Sweden
- SS Stakesby (1930), in service until 1940, when torpedoed and later sank; salvaged in 1942 and rebuilt as Empire Derwent

== See also ==
- Stakesby (1814 ship) – launched at Whitby and foundered 1846
