= Russian cutter Opyt =

Ship of the Imperial Russian Navy

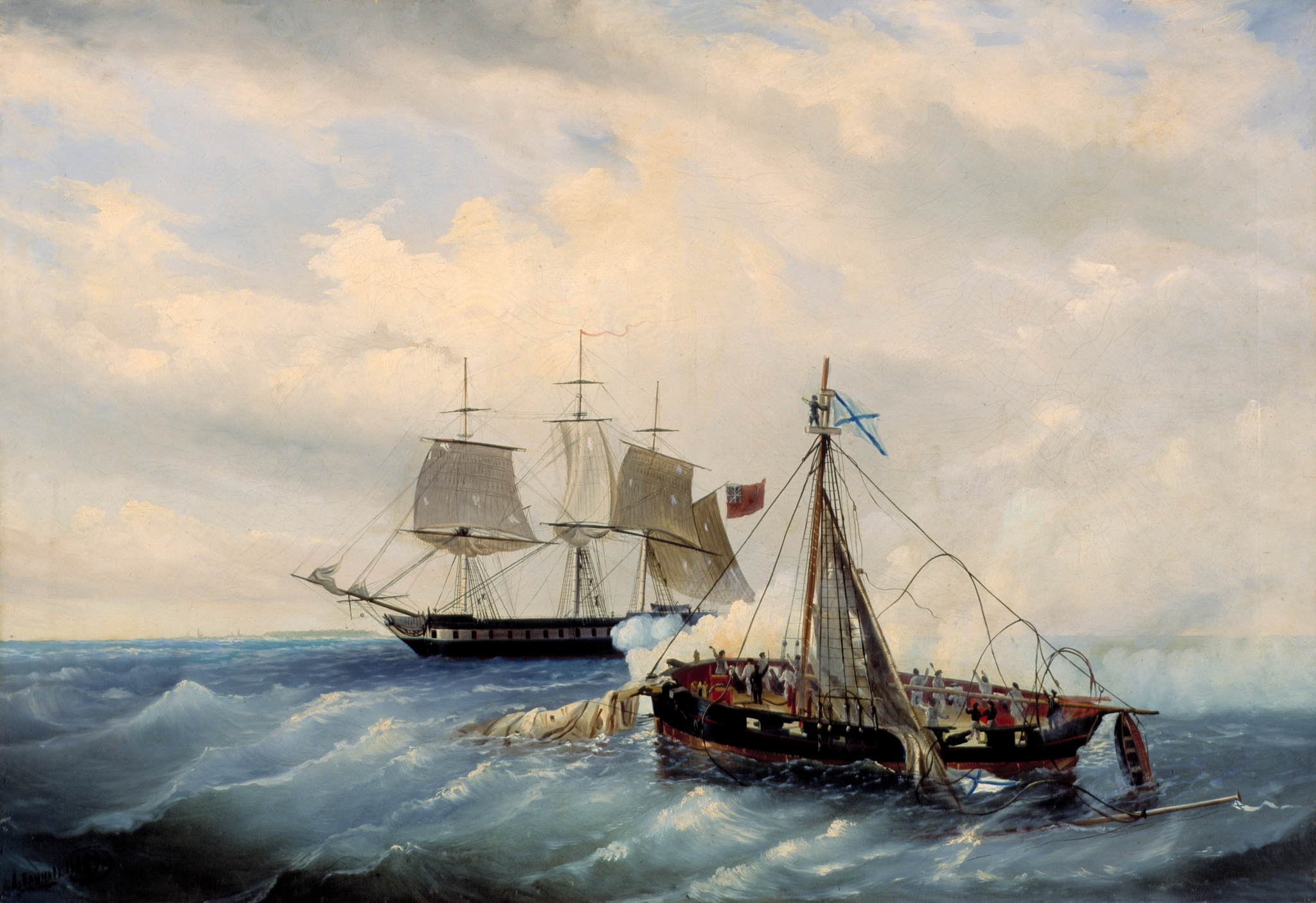
- Battle between the Russian ship Opyt and the British frigate HMS Salsette off the coast of Nargen Island, 11 June 1808, 1889 by Leonid Demyanovich Blinov (1868–93), in the State Central Navy Museum, St. Petersburg

History

Russian Empire
- Name: Opyt
- Builder: I. V. Kurepanov, St Petersburg
- Laid down: 1805
- Launched: 9 October [O.S. 27 September] 1806
- Captured: 23 June [O.S. 11 June] 1808

United Kingdom
- Name: HMS Baltic
- Acquired: By capture 23 June [O.S. 11 June] 1808
- Fate: Sold 1810

General characteristics
- Tons burthen: 178 64/94 (bm (by calc.))
- Length: 65 ft 10 in (20.1 m) (deck)
- Beam: 25 ft 10 in (7.9 m)
- Depth of hold: 9 ft 4 in (2.8 m)
- Propulsion: Sail
- Complement: 53
- Armament: 14 × 12-pounder carronades

The Russian cutter Opyt (also Apith; Russian: Опыт – Experience) was launched in 1806. The British 44-gun frigate HMS Salsette captured Opyt in 1808 in the Baltic during the Anglo-Russian War (1807-1812) after her captain and crew put up heroic resistance. The Admiralty took her into service as HMS Baltic. She served briefly with the British fleet under Vice-Admiral Sir James Saumarez in the Baltic before being sold in 1810.

== Russian service ==
Opyt was a purpose-built cutter that cruised the Baltic in 1807. On 10 June [O.S. 28 May] 1808, she arrived at Sveaborg from Kronshtadt to join the division under Captain of 2nd rank Lodewijk van Heiden (who went on to become the Russian Admiral at the Battle of Navarino in 1827), to help in the city's defense. On 16 June [O.S. 4 June], Opyt put to sea in company with the sloop-of-war Charlotta to cruise between Sveaborg and Hanko. During this cruise the two vessels became separated. Opyt returned to Sveaborg and was sent to find Charlotta, but before she could meet up, she encountered Salsette.

== Capture ==
On 23 June [O.S. 11 June] 1808, Captain Walter Bathurst and Salsette chased a Russian sloop-of-war to Reval and captured a galliot partly laden with spirits at anchor in the roads. As Bathurst was bringing out his prize he saw a Russian cutter off the north end of Nargen island (now Naissaar), which defends Reval from the sea.

Salsette gave chase but in the evening, when the wind dropped, the cutter killed one of Salsette's marines in an exchange of fire and used her sweeps to pull away. Then a sudden squall enabled Salsette to catch up with the cutter. The cutter surrendered after the frigate had fired two full broadsides into her.

The cutter was the Opyt (a.k.a. Apith), with a crew of 61 men under the command of Lieutenant Gavriil Nevelskoy (also Novelski). (Note: Treadrea and Sozaev give the complement as 53. In the fight the cutter lost four men killed and eight wounded (Nevelskoy was among the wounded), before she struck. Tredrea and Sozaev give casualties as two killed and 11 wounded. The difference in the number of dead between the British and Russian counts may reflect deaths from wounds post-engagement.)

After doing more to satisfy Russian honour than reason required, Lieutenant Nevelskoy surrendered his heavily damaged cutter to the British commander, Captain Bathurst, only to have his sword returned by the astounded and admiring British captain, who had him landed ashore along with his surviving crew members.

The British discovered that Opyt had left Sveaborg that day to join the Russian sloop Charlotta, which Salsette had unsuccessfully chased. Bathurst landed the survivors near Libau (now Liepāja, Latvia).

Bathurst reported that the Opyt was approximately two years old, "exceedingly well fitted, and sound in everything." Saumarez ordered the purchase of the cutter for His Majesty's service and manned her with "men lately exchanged from Copenhagen."

== British service ==
The British took Opyt into service as HMS Baltic and commissioned her under Edward Sparshott.

On 26 July 1808, Baltic, Superb, and Monkey captured Falck and Kline Wiloelm.

Sparshot later (28 April 1809) received promotion to lieutenant for his zeal in capturing 21 enemy merchant sail in the Baltic. One of these was Emanuel, captured on 22 November 1808. Four days later, Baltic was in sight when Rose captured Defence, Anna Joanna Magdalena, and a second Emanuel. Baltic also was one of several vessels that participated in the capture of Falck and Kline Wilhelm on 31 August. Then on 7 March 1809, Baltic was in company with the sloop Ranger when they captured the Danish ships Magdalena, Boletta, Britannia, Den Gode Hensight, Walhala, and Christina.

At the time, Saumarez and the British fleet were blockading Rogerwiek, where the Russian fleet was sheltering after the British 74-gun third rates Implacable and Centaur had destroyed the Russian 74-gun ship of the line Vsevolod. Baltic's initial task was to land the prisoners that Implacable had taken from Vsevolod.

Saumarez wanted to attack the fleet and ordered that Baltic and Erebus be prepared as fireships. However, when the British discovered that the Russians had stretched a chain across the entrance to the harbor, precluding an attack by fireships, Saumarez abandoned the plan; the two vessels returned to normal duties.

== Fate ==
Baltic was paid off in April 1809 and underwent repairs at Plymouth. The Admiralty sold Baltic in 1810.
