= HMS Genoa =

Ship of the line of the French Navy

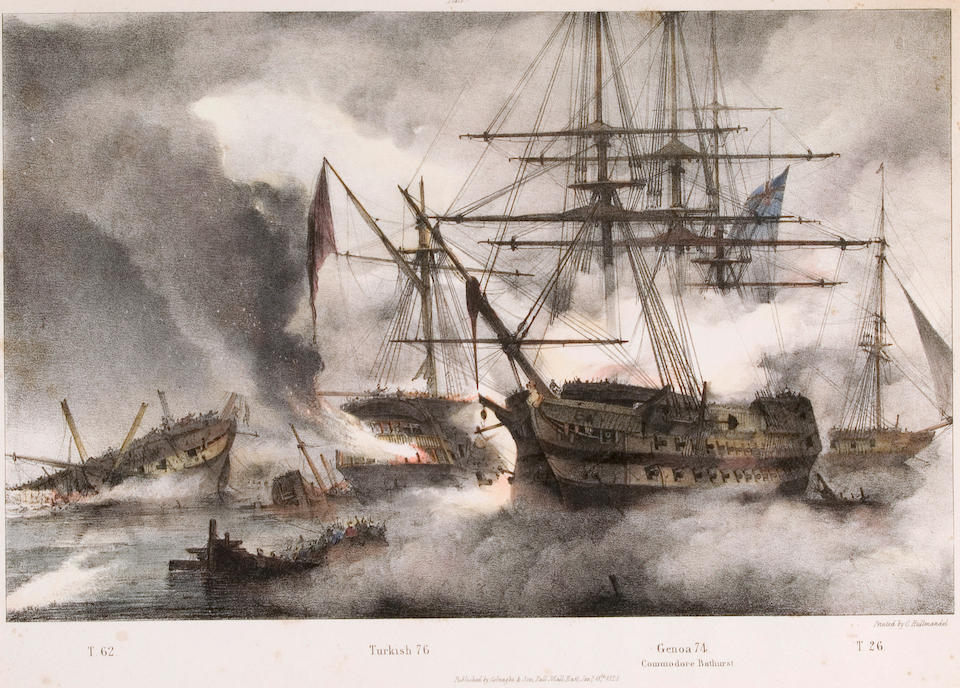
- HMS Genoa, Commodore Bathurst, at the Battle of Navarino 20 October 1827, drawn by George Philip Reinagle from onboard HMS Mosquito

History

France
- Name: Brillant
- Builder: Genoa
- Laid down: 1813
- Captured: On slip 18 April 1814

United Kingdom
- Name: Genoa
- Launched: 18 April 1815
- Acquired: 18 April 1814
- Commissioned: 18 May 1821
- Fate: Broken up, January 1838

General characteristics
- Class & type: Téméraire-class ship of the line
- Displacement: 3,069 tonneaux
- Tons burthen: 1,537 port tonneaux
- Length: 55.87 metres (183.3 ft) (172 pied)
- Beam: 14.90 metres (48 ft 11 in)
- Draught: 7.26 metres (23.8 ft) (22 pied)
- Propulsion: Up to 2,485 m^{2} (26,750 sq ft) of sails
- Complement: 600
- Armament: 74 guns: Lower gundeck: 28 × 36-pounder long guns; Upper gundeck: 30 × 18-pounder long guns; Forecastle and Quarter deck: 6 × 8-pounder long guns; 10 × 36-pounder carronades
- Armour: Timber

HMS Genoa was a 74-gun Téméraire-class ship of the line built for the French Navy as Brillant during the 1810s. She was captured incomplete while still on slipway by the British during the fall of Genoa in 1814. She was completed for the Royal Navy and served as HMS Genoa until 1838. On 20 October 1827 Genoa took part in the Battle of Navarino where her captain Walter Bathurst was killed.

== Service ==
=== Capture ===
Brillant was constructed at Genoa between February 1812 and April 1815, as the city had been annexed by France in 1805. On 18 April 1814 she was captured while still in construction by an invading British squadron commanded by Captain Sir Josias Rowley. She was completed by the Royal Navy as HMS Genoa and launched on 18 April 1815.

=== Royal Navy career ===
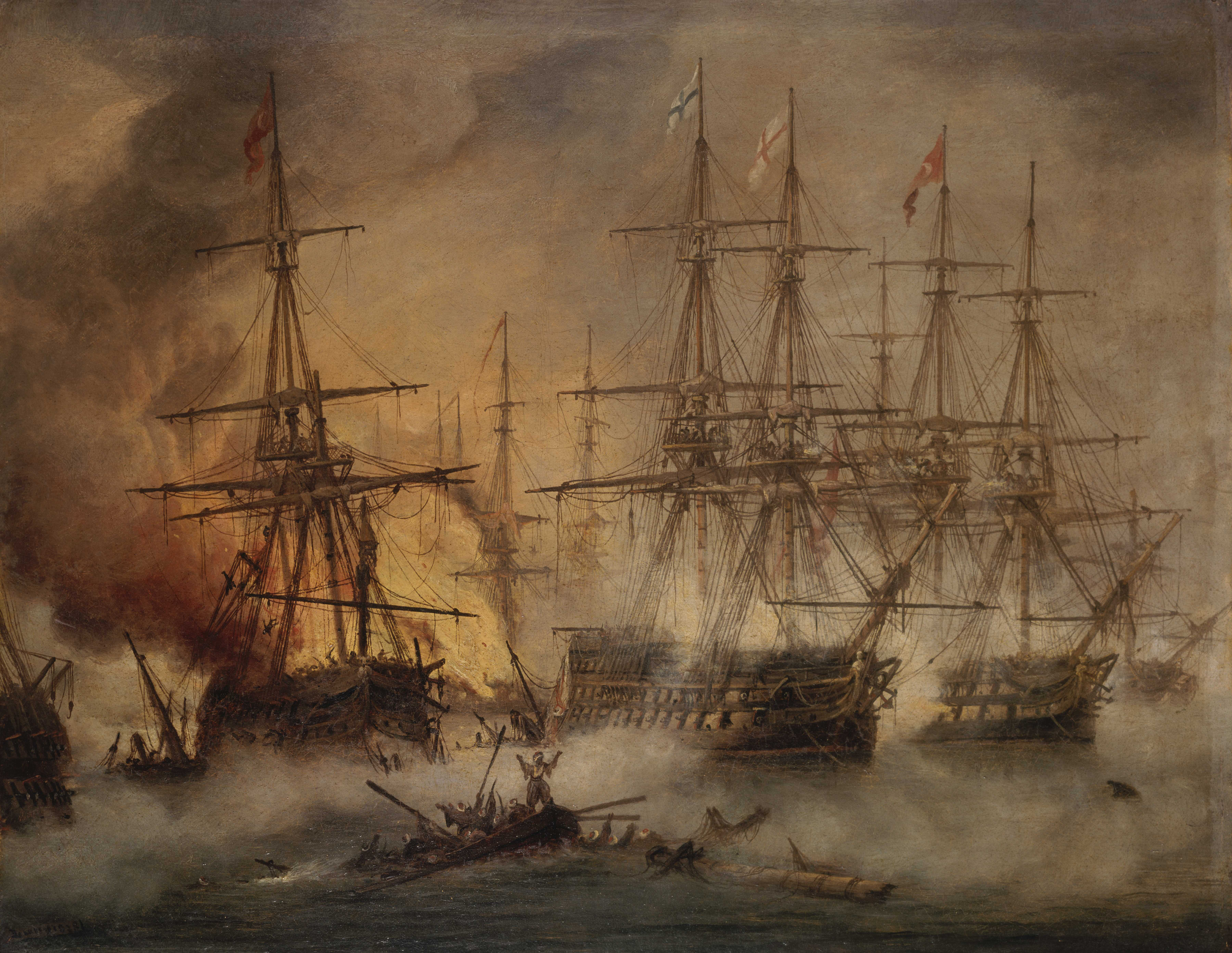
The Battle of Navarino, 20 October 1827, by Thomas Luny after Reinagle. A part of the port side of Genoa can be seen in the extreme left foreground

Genoa sailed for Britain after her launching and arrived at Chatham on 13 October 1815. From September 1816 to February 1818 Genoa underwent repairs to configure her as a British ship instead of the French one she was constructed as. Her first role was as guard ship at Chatham from 18 May until October 1821 under Captain Frederick Lewis Maitland. Genoa was then commissioned on 3 October under Captain Sir Thomas Livingstone to serve on the Lisbon Station, which she did until 1825. While off Lisbon, Captain William Cumberland assumed command in October 1824, and in turn was replaced by Captain Walter Bathurst who by 27 May 1825 had Genoa as part of the Mediterranean Fleet.

On 20 October 1827 Genoa and the fleet took part in the Battle of Navarino. Genoa received heavy fire during the battle in her role supporting the flagship HMS Asia, resulting in high casualty numbers. The enemy Turks fired their guns high into Genoa, killing so many Royal Marines on the poop deck that they were forced to retreat to the lower quarterdeck to lessen their casualties. She had the most men killed during the battle of the British ships present, twenty six, including Captain Bathurst. Bathurst was injured early on by a large splinter lacerating his face, and was later killed by a round shot. (Note: Captain Bathurst did not succumb to his wounds straight away, but was carried down to the ship's cockpit where he spent the rest of the battle before dying at around 3 a.m. on 21 October.) Command of Genoa during the battle then devolved to her second captain, Commander Richard Dickinson. Admiral Edward Codrington described Genoa's manoeuvres to assist his flagship during the battle as 'beautiful'. Captain Charles Leonard Irby was appointed by Codrington to take Genoa home in the place of Bathurst, and by November she had arrived at Plymouth.

Genoa was paid off in January 1828 before becoming a receiving ship between 1833 and 1837. She was broken up at Plymouth in January 1838.
