= Hyder Ally (1814 ship) =

1814 Privateer

History

United States
- Name: Hyder Ally
- Owner: William Sturgis, John Bryant, and Thomas Ward, (all of Boston)
- Builder: Samuel Fickett, Portland, Maine
- Laid down: 1812
- Commissioned: 18 January 1814
- Captured: 12 June 1814

General characteristics
- Tons burthen: 367 (bm)
- Complement: Privateer: 50; At capture:30
- Armament: 12 × 18-pounder carronades + 2 × 18-pounder guns + 2 × 9-pounder guns

Hyder Ally (or Hyder Alley, or Hyder Ali) was a privateer from Portland, Maine, that received a letter of marque in 1814. She sailed to the eastern Indian Ocean where she captured three prizes before the British Royal Navy captured her in 1814.

== American privateer ==
Hyder Ally sailed out of Portland, Maine under the command of Captain Israel Thorndike, who received a letter of marque on 18 January 1814. One source states that after HMS Boxer's capture in September 1813, her guns went to arm Hyder Ally. However, Hyder Ally's guns and carronades do not match those that Boxer carried.

Captain Thorndike sailed Hyder Ally to the eastern Indian Ocean. There she escaped after being chased for three days by Salsette.

Hyder Ally captured three British merchant vessels, all of which she sent to the United States manned by prize crews. (Note: By some American reports, Hyder Ali captured nine British vessels, all of which were recaptured.)

On 27 April Hyder Ali captured Betsey, Bennett, master, a "country ship" that was, by one account, on her way from Sumatra to London. By another account, she was sailing from Calcutta on a coasting voyage.

On 8 May Hyder Ally captured Mary, Alleyn (or Allen), master, off the coast of Sumatra. Mary was carrying a cargo of pepper and gum.

On 9 May Hyder Ally captured the brig Favorite, a "country ship" of 158 tons (bm), as Favorite was on her way from Calcutta to Port Jackson.) (By another report, Hyder Ally had captured Favorite on 24 April.}

Capture: The British frigate Owen Glendower captured Hyder Ally on 12 June 1814 off the Nicobar Islands after a 10-hour chase. Owen Glendower took Hyder Ally into Pulu Penang.

The British recaptured Hyder Ally's three prizes before the prizes could reach the United States.

On her way to the United States, Mary had to put into the Cape of Good Hope in July because she was in distress and leaky; there the British took possession of her.

On 2 September 1814 Alban recaptured Favorite. Her master's name was given as W.Mayton, and her cargo consisted of tea, sugar, rice, and piece goods. Alban recaptured Favorite at Mount Desert Island.

The boats of HMS Pylades recaptured Betsey on 7 September 1814 in Frenchman's Bay after some resistance. (Note: Betsey, of 332 tons (bm), W.H.Bennett, master, had been built at Rangoon in 1810.) She was carrying a cargo of pepper and bettle nut. (Note: Another report gives the name of Betsey's recaptor as the British privateer Tom and the locus as Cape Elizabeth, Maine.)
