= HMS Magnet (1807) =

Brig-sloop of the Royal Navy

- Magnet

History

Royal Navy
- Name: HMS Magnet
- Ordered: 1 October 1806
- Builder: Robert Guillaume, Northam, Southampton
- Launched: 19 October 1807
- Fate: Wrecked 11 January 1809

General characteristics
- Class & type: Cruizer-class brig-sloop
- Tons burthen: 38241/94 (bm)
- Length: 100 ft 0 in (30.5 m) (gundeck); 77 ft 3 1/2 in (23.6 m) (keel)
- Beam: 30 ft 6 in (9.3 m)
- Depth of hold: 12 ft 9 in (3.9 m)
- Sail plan: Brig rigged
- Complement: 121
- Armament: 16 × 32-pounder carronades + 2 × 6-pounder chase guns

HMS Magnet was a Cruizer-class brig-sloop built at Robert Guillaume’s yard at Northam and launched in 1807. She served in the Baltic, where she took two prizes, one an armed privateer, before wrecking in 1809.

== Baltic ==
She was commissioned under Lieutenant George Morris, who sailed her for the Baltic. During the Finnish War of 1808–1809 Sweden and Britain were allies and Britain had stationed a squadron there to prevent the Russian high seas fleet from putting to sea.

On 2 June 1808. Magnet was in company with the frigate Salsette when they, together with the boats of Centaur and Implacable, captured four Russian vessels carrying corn. They also captured the boat Humbug.

On 20 August, Salsette, the ship sloop Ariel and Magnet joined the squadron under Samuel Hood in Centaur, which was blockading the Russian fleet in Rogerwick Bay. (Note: Rogerwick was also known as Rogerswick, Ragervik, Ragersvik, Roghervik, and Port Baltic. It is about 20 miles west of Reval, the present day Tallinn, the capital of Estonia.) On 30 August Sir James Saumarez arrived in HMS Victory, together with a number of other ships of the line and Cruizer, Magnet's sister and the name ship of their class. A number of other smaller vessels also arrived the next day.

The British made preparations to send in Baltic and Erebus as fire ships but when that proved impossible made no further real attempt to attack the Russians. On 30 September the British raised the blockade and sailed for Karlskrona; the Russians immediately sailed for Kronstadt. The bulk of the British fleet, including Saumarez, then departed Karlskrona for Britain, arriving in the Downs on 8 December. Magnet was one of the ships that stayed behind in the Baltic for trade protection purposes.

On 5 December, Magnet took the Danish privateer Paulina after encountering her off the island of Bornholm. Morris had in some manner disguised Magnet and so succeeded in luring Paulina out from her inshore shelter. Magnet then pursued Paulina throughout the afternoon and finally caught up with her at dusk about two miles off the north end of Bornholm. During the chase Paulina's crew of 42 men tried to lighten their vessel by throwing overboard all but three of her ten 4 and 8-pounder guns. Paulina was 12 days out of Copenhagen and had not captured anything.

== Loss ==
On 23 December 1808, Magnet left Karlskrona as part of the last convoy of the year, in company with four other British warships – Salsette, the brig-sloop Fama, the gun-brig Urgent, and the cutter Salorman - three Swedish naval vessels, and twelve merchant vessels. (Note: The Naval Chronicle lists the gun-brig as Ardent, but there was no gun-brig by that name and other sources give the name as Urgent. It is difficult to read the name of the cutter and other sources give the name as Sacorman or Saloman.) Unfortunately, the convoy left after an unusually severe winter had set in. Furthermore, a storm coming from the north drove already formed ice onto the convoy.

Fama parted company and was wrecked on the north-east point of Bornholm Island. The convoy sought shelter off Falsterbo on Christmas Day and remained there until 6 January 1809 when the vessels set sail in an attempt to reach Malmö.

Salorman, under the command of Andrew Duncan, was wrecked around 23 December at Ystad. She lost one man but the rest of her officers and men were saved. Urgent left with dispatches for the Baltic on 28 December and survived.

Ice blocked the entrance and the Swedish frigate Camilla and six ships of the convoy went aground. Magnet and three other ships of the convoy grounded on the Saltholm Shoal on 11 January. Magnet was refloated but ran into further difficulties in the ice before her crew finally ran her ashore at Örö, west of Malmö, where she sank. Morris managed to get his entire crew of 120 safely ashore and they eventually arrived in Gothenburg; Magnet was a complete loss. (Note: Grocott reports, apparently erroneously, that the crew was rescued by ships in company.) The teak-built Salsette escaped after being stuck in the ice for more than two months.

== Post-script ==
Thirty-four years later, in July 1842, Magnet was refloated and taken into Malmö. Her masts, sails, and rigging were in good condition. Three skeletons and the well-preserved body of a sailor were found in the ship. A quantity of woolen clothes were reported to have been found in good condition; linen clothes had rotted. Three silver watches found on the ship were deemed repairable.
