= Russian ship Vsevolod (1796) =

1796 ship of the line in Russian Navy

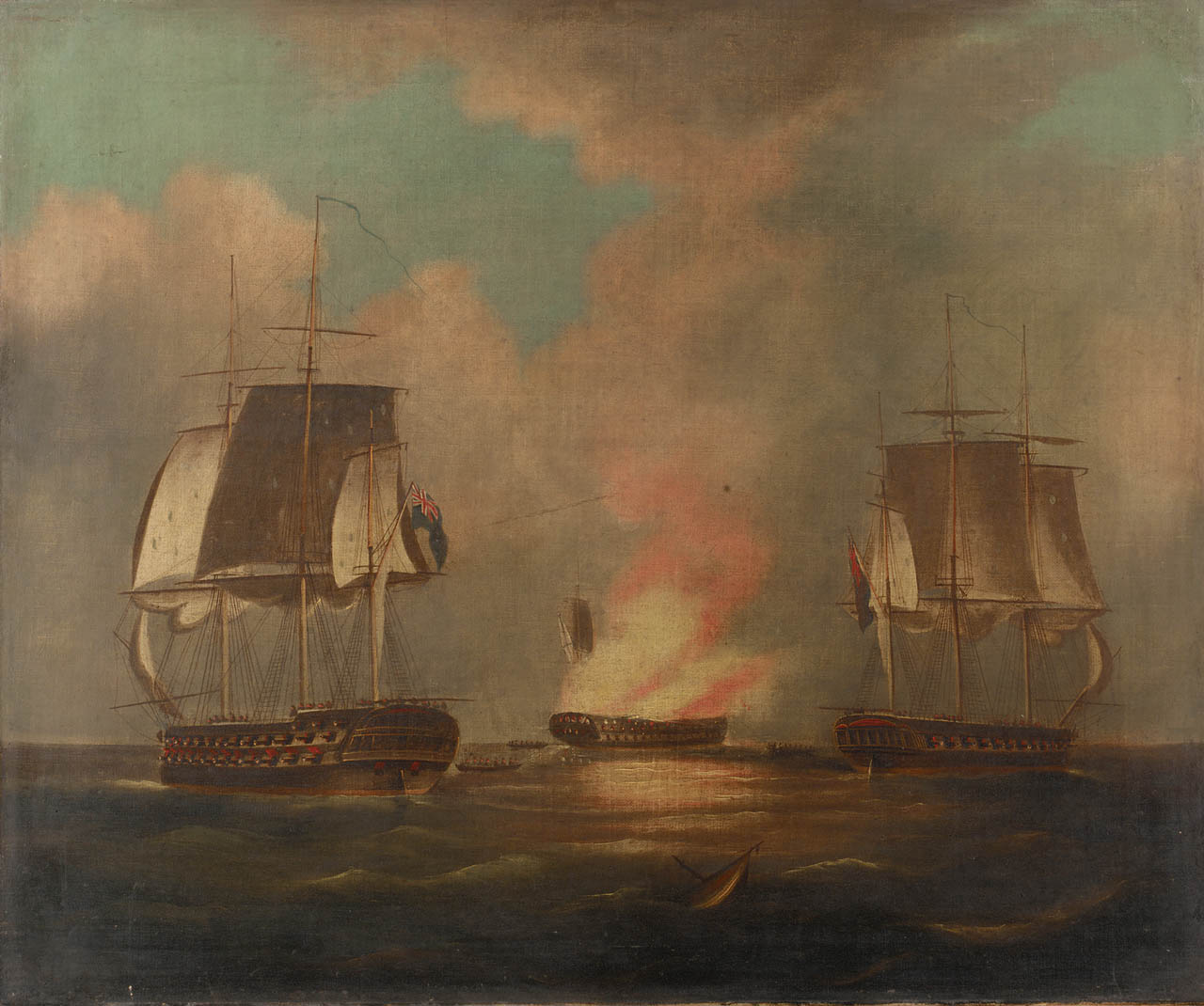
- Vsevolod being burnt on 26 August 1808

History

Russian Empire
- Name: Vsevolod
- Builder: G. Ignatyev
- Laid down: 4 October [O.S. 21 September] 1794
- Launched: 6 September [O.S. 24 August] 1796
- Fate: Destroyed on 26 August 1808

General characteristics
- Class & type: Yaroslav-class 74-gun ship of the line
- Length: 170 ft 0 in (51.8 m) (upper deck)
- Beam: 46 ft 6 in (14.2 m)
- Depth of hold: 20 ft 8 in (6.3 m)
- Propulsion: Sail (three masts, ship rig)
- Complement: 640
- Armament: Lower deck: 26 × 30-pounder guns + 2 × 48-pounder (1 pood) edinorogs; Upper deck: 26 × 18-pounder guns + 2 × 24-pounder (1/2 pood) edinorogs; Fc & QD: 18 × 8-pounder guns

Vsevolod (Russian: Всеволод) was a 74-gun ship of the line of the Imperial Russian Navy launched in 1796. She served in the North Sea and the Baltic until the British 74-gun third rates Implacable and Centaur destroyed her in 1808 during the Anglo-Russian War of 1807-1812.

== Service ==
On 3 July 1798 Vsevolod was at Arkhangelsk, serving as flagship for Vice-Adm. Thate, who commanded the 2nd Division of the Imperial Russian Navy. She then arrived at the Nore on 8 August and operated in the North Sea and off the Texel for almost three years. She returned to Kronstadt on 21 July 1800. She then carried supplies to Revel'. She then served in the Baltic before undergoing repairs in 1804. In September 1805 she transported troops to Pomerania.

=== Anglo-Russian War and loss ===
In early 1808 Russia initiated the Finnish War in response to Sweden's refusal to bow to Russian pressure to join the anti-British alliance. Russia captured Finland and made it a Grand Duchy under the Russian Empire. The British decided to take counter-measures and in May sent a fleet under Vice-Admiral Sir James Saumarez to the Baltic.

On 9 July, the Russian fleet, under Admiral Peter Khanykov, came out from Kronstadt. The Swedes massed a fleet under Swedish Admiral Rudolf Cederström, consisting of 11 line-of-battle ships and 5 frigates at Örö and Jungfrusund to oppose them. On 16 August, Saumarez then sent Centaur, Captain William Henry Webley, and Implacable, Captain Thomas Byam Martin, to join the Swedish fleet. They chased two Russian frigates on 19 July and joined the Swedes the following day.

On 22 August, the Russian fleet, consisting of nine ships of the line, five large frigates and six smaller ones, moved from Hanko to threaten the Swedes. The Swedes, with the two British ships, grouped at Örö, and three days later sailed to meet the Russians.

The Russians and the Anglo-Swedish force were fairly evenly matched, but the Russians retreated and the Allied ships followed them. Centaur and Implacable were better vessels than the Swedish ships and slowly pulled ahead, with Implacable catching up with Vsevolod, which was straggling.

On 24 August [O.S. 13 August] Vsevolod, under Captain Daniil Rudnev exchanged fire with Implacable, with the Russian suffering heavy casualties before running aground. During this exchange three nearby Russian ships failed to render assistance. Vsevolod struck her colors, but Hood recalled Implacable because the Russian fleet was approaching. During the fight Implacable lost six men killed and twenty-six wounded, including two who did not recover and three who had limbs amputated.; Vsevolod lost some 48 dead and 80 wounded.

The Russian frigate Poluks then towed Vsevolod towards Rager Vik (Ragerswik or Rogerswick or Russian: Baltiyskiy) where the Russian fleet was sheltering. However, Vsevolod grounded some six miles from the port.

On 25 August [O.S. 14 August] Centaur came up and was able to drive off the boats that were attempting to get the disabled ship into harbor. Seamen from Centaur were able to lash her mizzen to the Russian bowsprit before Centaur opened fire. Both vessels grounded, and both sides attempted to board the other vessel. However, Implacable came up and fired into Vsevolod for about 10 minutes, forcing the Russian ship to strike again.

Implacable hauled Centaur off. The battle had cost Centaur three killed and 27 wounded. Vsevolod, which had received about 100 men as reinforcements after her initial battle with Implacable, lost another 124 men killed and wounded in the battle with Centaur; 56 Russians swam ashore and so escaped being taken prisoner.

Their prize was so firmly aground that Sir Samuel Hood, in Centaur, ordered Vsevolod burnt. On 26 August [O.S. 15 August] the British removed their prisoners, including the wounded, and then set fire to Vsevolod, which blew up some hours later. The cutter Baltic would later land the prisoners.

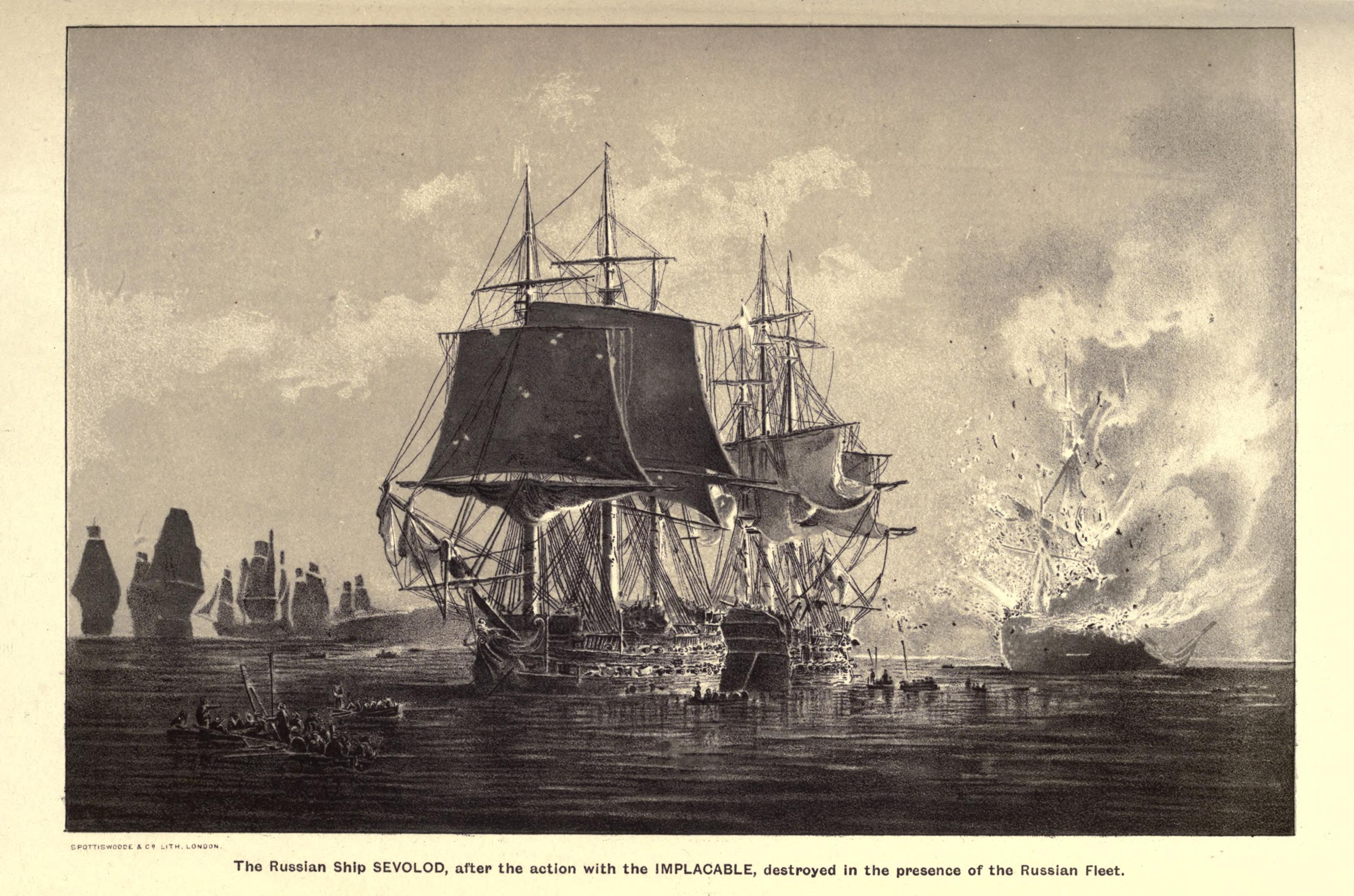
Vsevolod burning, after the action with Implacable and Centaur, destroyed in the presence of the Russian Fleet near Rogerwick bay on 26 August 1808.

=== Aftermath ===
Vice-Admiral Saumerez with his entire squadron joined the Anglo-Swedish squadron the next day. They then blockaded Khanykov's squadron at (Baltiyskiy). for some months. After the British and the Swedes abandoned the blockade, the Russian fleet was able to return to Kronstadt.

The Russian government court-martialed Admiral Khanykov for what the British Admiralty would have labeled as "failure to do his utmost". The court martial ordered Khanykov demoted to the rank of Ordinary Seaman for one day and dismissed from the service. What saved Khanykov from a more severe sentence was his earlier distinguished service. His Swedish Majesty Gustaf IV Adolf conferred upon Captain Martin of Implacable the Knight Grand Cross of the Order of the Sword. In 1847 the Admiralty awarded the Naval General Service Medal with clasps "Implacable 26 Augt. 1808" and "Centaur 26 Augt. 1808" to all surviving claimants from the action. Hood took Vsevolod's flag as a trophy and it ended up hanging in the main hall of the Hood family home "St. Audries".
