= Walter Bathurst =

Captain Walter Bathurst
- Born: c. 1764
- Died: 21 October 1827
- Military career
- Allegiance: Great Britain; United Kingdom
- Branch: Royal Navy
- Service years: 1780–1827
- Rank: Captain
- Commands: HMS Ville de Paris; HMS Eurydice; HMS Terpsichore; HMS Salsette/Pitt; HMS Fame; HMS Genoa
- Conflicts: American Revolutionary War; French Revolutionary Wars; Napoleonic Wars; Greek War of Independence

Walter Bathurst (c. 1764 – 21 October 1827) was a Royal Navy officer who was killed at the Battle of Navarino.

== Life ==
Bathurst's father was one of the thirty-six children of Sir Benjamin Bathurst MP, the younger brother of Allen, first Earl Bathurst. One of his uncles was Henry Bathurst, bishop of Norwich.

After being on the books of the guardship at Plymouth for more than a year, he was, on 5 October 1781, appointed to the Yarmouth, which, in the beginning of 1782, accompanied Sir George Rodney to the West Indies, and participated in the Battle of the Saintes off Dominica on 12 April. He afterwards served in Perseus, and was made lieutenant on 15 November 1790. In April 1791 was appointed to the brig Ferret on the home station. He continued in her for nearly three years, and on 30 December 1793 was appointed to the frigate Andromache, in which he served on the Newfoundland Station, and afterwards with the fleet off Cadiz under Lord St Vincent.

In May 1797 he was transferred to the Ville de Paris, and on 3 July 1798 was appointed captain of the same ship by order from Lord St. Vincent. His promotion was not confirmed until 24 October 1799; but he continued to command the Ville de Paris until May 1800, and for a great part of the time with Lord St. Vincent's flag at the main. He afterwards commanded the frigates Eurydice, Terpsichore, and Pitt, in the East Indies, in all of which he was fortunate in making several rich prizes. Having brought home Pitt, renamed Salsette, he still commanded her in the Baltic in 1808, and in July 1809 was employed in escorting part of Lord Chatham's army to Walcheren. The following year he was appointed to the 74-gun ship Fame in which he went out to the Mediterranean, and stayed there until the end of the war.

He had no further service until 1824, when he commissioned the 74-gun Genoa which, on 20 October 1827, formed part of the fleet commanded by Sir Edward Codrington at Navarino. The accident of position caused the Genoa's loss to be very heavy; her list of killed considerably exceeded that of any other ship in the fleet, and included Bathurst, who died of his wounds on 21 October. Codrington wrote a personal letter of condolence to Bathurst's widow, the mother of five children. One of these, following his father's steps, entered the navy, and had attained the rank of commander, when he died at an early age.
