= Joseph Napoleon's Regiment (France) =

Joseph Napoleon’s Regiment
- Régiment de Joseph Napoléon; Regimiento de José Napoleón
- Regimental standard front and back
- Active: February 1809 – 17 April 1814
- Country: (First French Empire) French Empire
- Allegiance: Napoleon I
- Branch: French Imperial Army
- Type: Line infantry
- Size: Regiment of four battalions (Note: The regimental depot and depot battalion are not included in this figure, as they are not combat units.)
- Part of: Imperial Foreign Troops
- Engagements: Napoleonic Wars; Russian Campaign; Battle of Shevardino; Battle of Borodino; Battle of Krasnoi; Battle of the Berezina; War of the Sixth Coalition; Battle of Lützen; Battle of Batuzen; Battle of Leipzig; Battle of Hanau

Commanders
- Notable commanders: Jean de Kindelan

Joseph Napoleon's Regiment (French: Régiment de Joseph Napoléon / Spanish: Regimiento de José Napoleón) was a foreign infantry regiment of the French Imperial Army formed during the mid-years of the Napoleonic Wars. The regiment would see service only on the eastern front, notably at the Battle of Borodino, Battle of Lützen, and Battle of Leipzig. Following Napoleon's first abdication, the regiment was disbanded and its personnel were distributed among other units.

== Background ==
In 1807, the Bourbon monarchs of Spain sent an expeditionary force from the regular Spanish Army to Northern Europe, to serve with the French La Grande Armée. The expeditionary force, the Division of the North, was commanded by Marquis de la Romana and consisted of four regiments of line infantry, five regiments of cavalry, two battalions of light infantry, and supporting artillery. The Spanish expeditionary force participated in the siege of the Swedish fortress of Stralsund in late 1807. The Spanish expeditionary force was then broken up and stationed in different parts of Denmark.

The Spanish expeditionary force was still in Denmark in the summer of 1808, when news of events in Spain arrived. The Bourbons of Spain had been forced to abdicate and Napoleon proclaimed his brother, Joseph Bonaparte, as King of Spain on 6 June 1808. Napoleon's invasion of Portugal and overthrowing of the Spanish monarchs would result in conflict between France and Portugal, Spain, and Great Britain in the Iberian Peninsula until 1814, which became known as the Peninsular War.

The crowning of Joseph Bonaparte as King of Spain was considered by many in the Spanish expeditionary force as disgraceful. However, the Spanish expeditionary force was too far from Spain and too close to French forces to do anything about the situation in Spain. However, a British agent contacted the leader of the Spanish expeditionary force, Marquis de la Romana, and offered transportation to Spain by British ships, La Romana accepted. In August 1808 the Spanish expeditionary force seized the Danish port of Nyborg; however, not all the units of the Spanish expeditionary force made a successful embarkation, the Asturias and Guadalaxara Spanish infantry regiments were overwhelmed, disarmed and captured by French and Danish forces. The Algarve Spanish cavalry regiment, the farthest unit from Nyborg, did not attempt to escape and actually revealed the escape plot to the French. In total over 3,500 Spanish troops became prisoners of war.

== Formation ==
In the autumn of 1808 Napoleon considered the possibility of using Spanish regiments in French service in the Peninsular War and would later become part of King Joseph Bonaparte's army. General Jean Kindelan, second in command of the former Spanish expeditionary force, had not participated in the escape plot and took an oath of allegiance to King Joseph Bonaparte. Kindelan supported the idea that within the 3,500 Spanish prisoners, there would be a sufficient number who would accept the new ruler of Spain and provide a nucleus for a new military unit for service in the Peninsular War.

On 13 February 1809 a decree specified the formation of Joseph Napoleon's Regiment. The regiment was formed as a line infantry regiment along French regulations and organization (although allowed to conduct drills and manoeuvres in Spanish). The regiment consisted of four combat battalions and one depot battalion; each battalion had four fusilier companies, one grenadier company, and one voltigeur company. Formation of the new regiment was slow, since it was formed entirely from Spanish prisoners of war and distinctions had to be made between those who genuinely wanted to serve and those who would desert and fight against the French.

=== Commanders ===
General Jean Kindelan commanded Joseph Napoleon's Regiment from 13 February 1809 until 19 January 1812. Colonel Jean Baptiste Marie Joseph de Tschudy commanded from 19 January 1812 until 25 November 1813, when the unit was ordered to be disbanded.

== Combat history ==
By the spring of 1810 the regiment was fully organized, King Joseph Bonaparte asked that Joseph Napoleon's Regiment be sent to Spain to serve with his army. However, due to the situation in Spain the loyalty of the unit could not be guaranteed if it was sent to Spain. Instead Joseph Napoleon's Regiment was broken up and the four combat battalions were sent to Italy, the Netherlands, Germany, and France.

In 1812 during the French invasion of Russia, Joseph Napoleon's Regiment was deployed for combat. The 2nd and 3rd battalions formed part of Marshal Davout's I Corps while the 1st and 4th battalions formed part of Prince Eugene's IV Corps. In the 1812 campaign Joseph Napoleon's Regiment fought at Shevardino, forming squares and protected a French infantry regiment that had been attacked and disorganized by Russian cavalry from further cavalry attacks. At the Battle of Borodino all four battalions of Joseph Napoleon's Regiment were present, the 3rd and 4th battalions participated in fighting for the great redoubt that dominated the battlefield at Borondino. Joseph Napoleon's Regiment fought during the French retreat from Russia at Battle of Krasnoi and Battle of Berezina. During this retreat, about 300 soldiers defected from the French in Vilnius and joined the Russian army, where they formed the Imperial Alexander Regiment; they were later transported to Spain to fight the French occupants. In the 1813 campaign in Germany Joseph Napoleon's Regiment fought at Battle of Lützen, Battle of Bautzen, Battle of Leipzig, and Battle of Hanau.

== Disbandment ==
By mid-1813 Joseph Napoleon's Regiment had been reduced to one combat battalion and the depot battalion. On 25 November 1813 a decree ordered the disbandment of Joseph Napoleon's Regiment, on 24 December the troops of Joseph Napoleon's Regiment surrendered their weapons and were converted into a pioneer regiment. The pioneer regiment was disbanded on 17 April 1814.

== In popular culture ==
Spanish author Arturo Pérez-Reverte wrote a short novel La sombra del águila about the participation of this regiment in the Battle of Borodino.
