= François Nicolas Fririon =

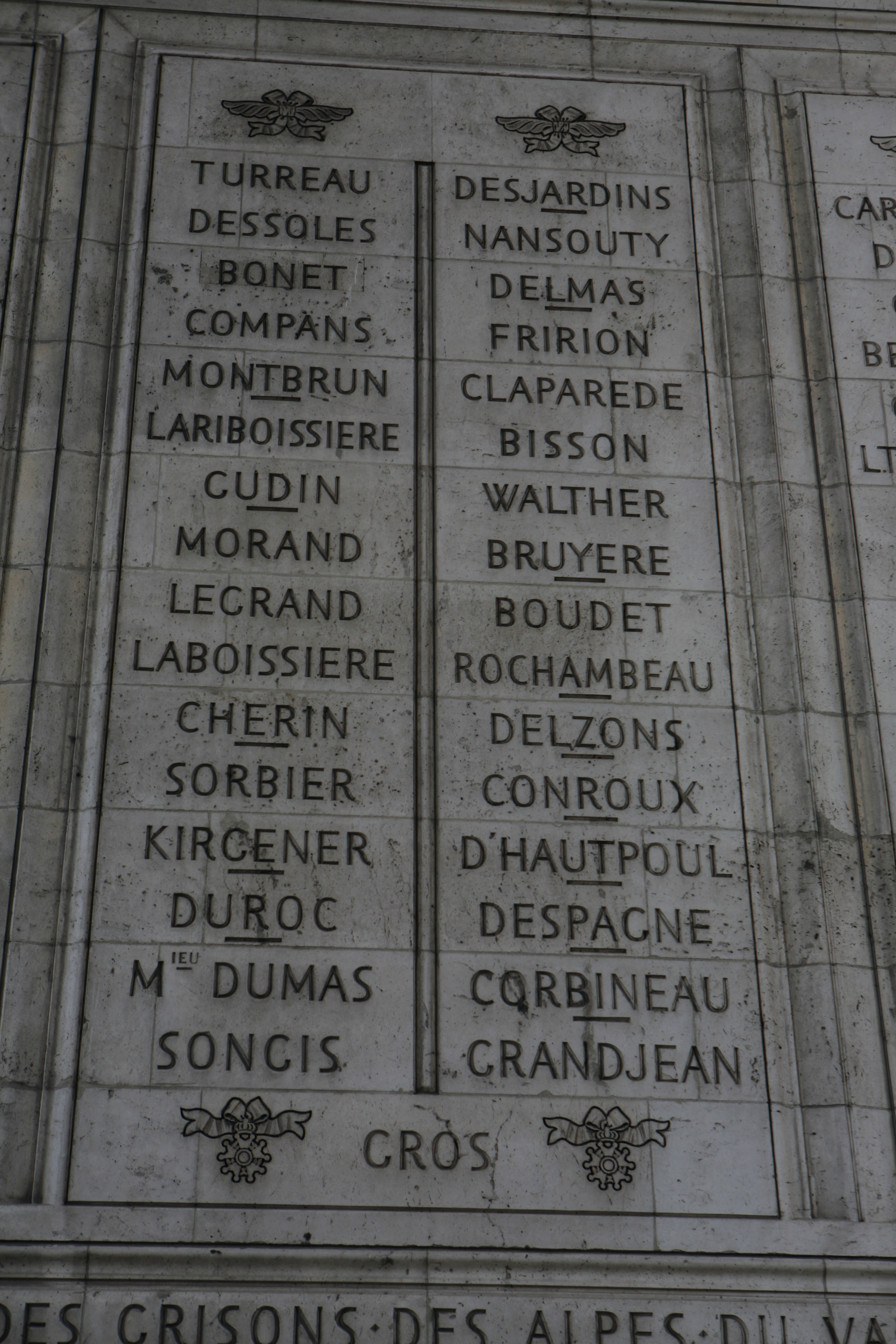
- FRIRION is the fourth name on Column 16.
- Born: 7 February 1766
- Died: 25 September 1840 (aged 74)
- Allegiance: France
- Branch: Infantry, Staff
- Service years: (Kingdom of France) 1782–1791 (France) 1791–1840
- Rank: General of Division
- Conflicts: War of the First Coalition; War of the Second Coalition; Battle of Verona; Battle of Magnano; Battle of Hohenlinden; War of the Third Coalition; Battle of Caldiero; War of the Fourth Coalition; Siege of Stralsund; War of the Fifth Coalition; Battle of Aspern-Essling; Battle of Wagram; Peninsular War; Siege of Almeida; Battle of Bussaco; Battle of Fuentes de Oñoro
- Awards: Légion d'honneur, CC 1804
- Other work: Baron of the Empire, 1810

François Nicolas Mathus Fririon (French pronunciation: [fʁɑ̃swa nikɔlɑ matys fʁiʁjɔ̃]; 7 February 1766 – 25 September 1840) joined the French army and rose through the ranks during the French Revolutionary Wars to become a general officer by 1800. After commanding a brigade with distinction during the War of the Fifth Coalition at Aspern-Essling and Wagram he was promoted and made chief of staff to Marshal André Masséna. He served in this role during Masséna's 1810–1811 invasion of Portugal. His history of that campaign was published posthumously by his son. His surname is one of the names inscribed under the Arc de Triomphe, on Column 16.

== Early career ==
Friron was born on 7 February 1766 in Vandieres in what later became Meurthe department in eastern France. He joined the French Royal Army in 1782 as a volunteer. After the start of the French Revolutionary Wars he was promoted to chef de bataillon (major) in 1794. He became an adjutant general chef de brigade (colonel) on 9 March 1797. He fought in Switzerland and later in Italy under Barthélemy Louis Joseph Schérer. He served as chief of staff to Jacques Maurice Hatry at the Battle of Verona on 26 March 1799 and the Battle of Magnano on 5 April. After fighting on the Rhine in 1799, Jean Victor Marie Moreau nominated him for promotion. His appointment as general of brigade came through on 17 July 1800. Subsequently, he fought at the Battle of Hohenlinden on 3 December 1800.

== General of Brigade ==
During the peace, Fririon commanded the troops in the Bas-Rhin department. He later fought under Marshal André Masséna in Italy. He served at the Siege of Stralsund which lasted from 15 January to 20 August 1807, when the Swedish garrison abandoned the city. On 25 August he and French naval Captain Montcabrié attacked the fortified island of Dänholm between Stralsund and Rügen. The 1,200-man French force included one battalion of the 30th Light Infantry Regiment, two artillery pieces and crews, and detachments of sappers, miners, and Sailors of the Imperial Guard. The operation was a success, costing the French only 15 dead and 26 wounded. The 900-man Swedish garrison lost 50 killed, 75 wounded, and 517 captured. Six field pieces and eight heavy cannons also fell into French hands. The following year found him serving under Marshal Jean-Baptiste Bernadotte in Denmark. He was present during the mutiny of two Spanish regiments on 31 July 1808, during which his aide was killed. The mutiny was suppressed the next day by a superior force of Danish troops. However, most of the other units of the Spanish Northern Division escaped in British vessels during the evacuation of La Romana's division.

In the 1809 war, Fririon led a brigade in Jean Boudet's 4th Division of Masséna's IV Corps. The brigade consisted only of two battalions of the 3rd Light Infantry Regiment and began the campaign with 1,545 men. At the Battle of Aspern-Essling, Boudet's division heroically defended Essling for the better part of two days against repeated Austrian attacks. Finally, at 3:00 pm on 22 May the troops were chased out of the village except for the granary where Boudet and some grenadiers held out. During the struggle, Marshal Jean Lannes wrote out a special commendation for Fririon's valiant fighting, "General, you have covered yourself with glory, you and your brigade; I will report your conduct to the Emperor". Essling was later retaken by the Imperial Guard, but Lannes was mortally wounded in the fighting.

Fririon led his brigade at the Battle of Wagram on 5 and 6 July 1809. The two battalions of the 3rd Light numbered 1,270 men. On the second day, the VI Austrian Corps fell on Boudet's isolated division, overwhelming it and capturing its artillery. However, the Austrians immediately came under an intense bombardment from Jean Reynier's massed artillery on Lobau Island. The VI Corps recoiled, allowing Boudet's troops to avoid total destruction. The French victory was decided on another part of the battlefield. Fririon also fought in the Battle of Znaim on 10–11 July.

== General of Division ==
Fririon was promoted to general of division on 21 July 1809. He soon became chief of staff to Marshal Masséna, replacing Nicolas Léonard Beker who had angered Emperor Napoleon. He was named Baron of the Empire on 31 January 1810. He continued in his role as Masséna's chief of staff during the 1810–1811 invasion of Portugal. At the Siege of Almeida, Fririon carried an ultimatum to William Cox, the fortress commanding officer, after the fort's main magazine exploded, killing 600 defenders. Cox surrendered the next day, on 27 August.

The Battle of Bussaco was fought on 27 September 1810. The night before, Fririon recommended that the Anglo-Portuguese army of Arthur Wellesley, Viscount Wellington be flanked out of position instead of assaulted directly. Masséna dismissed this idea, saying, "You are of the Army of the Rhine, you like to maneuver; this is the first time that Wellington appears disposed to offer battle. I will profit by the occasion". The attack was a failure with the French suffering 4,479 killed, wounded or captured against only 1,252 Allied casualties. While the French army was before the Lines of Torres Vedras, Fririon urged that the VIII Corps be withdrawn from its exposed position at the village of Sobral. During Masséna's tenure in command the Battle of Fuentes de Oñoro would be fought on 3–5 May 1811.

The historian Charles Oman wrote that Fririon was "scientific" and got along well with his fellow soldiers. However, Masséna appeared to rely too much on his senior aide-de-camp, Jean-Jacques Germain Pelet-Clozeau and sometimes changed his instructions without consulting with Fririon. Certainly, there was friction among Massena's staff during the campaign. After the Portugal campaign, Fririon became commander of the 1st Military Division. Under the Bourbon Restoration he served as an inspector general of infantry.

== Later career ==
Fririon died on 25 September 1840. His son published his papers in 1841 as, Journal historique de la campagne de Portugal. The work was disapproving of Masséna's aide Pelet. But unlike others who wrote that Pelet had undue influence over the marshal, Fririon minimized the aide's role. Stung by the criticism, Pelet later wrote his own history of the campaign.

In his history of the Portugal campaign, Fririon wrote perceptively about Napoleon's many exaggerated bulletins, "This is how history was written at the time; it was by reports of this lying description than an attempt was made to calm anxious families. Did no one reflect that, by deceiving them in this way, the government made enemies of all those who trusted for a time in the exactitude of the Bulletins, and lost their illusion soon after, when they learnt the melancholy ends of their sons and brothers?" FRIRION is engraved on the east side of the Arc de Triomphe.

== Bibliography ==
- Acerbi, Enrico (2007). "The 1799 Campaign in Italy: Battle of Magnano". The Napoleon Series.
- Arnold, James R. (1995). Napoleon Conquers Austria. Westport, Conn.: Praeger Publishers. ISBN 0-275-94694-0.
- Bowden, Scotty; Tarbox, Charlie (1980). Armies on the Danube 1809. Arlington, Texas: Empire Games Press.
- Broughton, Tony (2006). "Generals Who Served in the French Army during the Period 1789-1814: Fabre to Fyons". The Napoleon Series.
- Horward, Donald D., ed. (1973). The French Campaign in Portugal 1810-1811: An Account by Jean Jacques Pelet. Minneapolis: University of Minnesota Press. ISBN 0-8166-0658-7.
- Mullié, Charles (1852). Biographie des célébrités militaires des armées de terre et de mer de 1789 a 1850 (in French). Paris.
- Oman, Charles (2010) [1902]. A History of the Peninsular War Volume I. La Vergne, Tenn.: Kessinger Publishing. ISBN 978-1432636821.
- Oman, Charles (1996) [1908]. A History of the Peninsular War Volume III. Vol. 3. Mechanicsburg, Pennsylvania: Stackpole. ISBN 1-85367-223-8.
- Smith, Digby (1998). The Napoleonic Wars Data Book. London: Greenhill. ISBN 1-85367-276-9.
