= HMS Fama (1808) =

Brig of the Royal Navy

History

Denmark-Norway
- Name: HDMS Fama
- Builder: Hohlenberg, Nyholm, Copenhagen
- Launched: 1802
- Captured: 11 August 1808

United Kingdom
- Name: HMS Fama
- Acquired: 11 August 1808 (by capture)
- Fate: Wrecked 23 December 1808

General characteristics
- Class & type: Brev Drageren-class
- Type: brig
- Tons burthen: c.180 (Builder's Old Measurement)
- Length: 82 Danish feet 10 Danish inches
- Beam: 21 Danish feet 6 Danish inches
- Draught: Laden: 10 Danish feet 6 Danish inches; Unladen: 8 Danish feet 2 Danish inches
- Complement: 57 (Danish service)
- Armament: Danish service (original): 8 × 4-pounder guns + 4 × 12-pounder carronades; Danish service (per later records): 12 × 12-pounder carronades 2 × 6-pounder guns; British service: 14 guns

HMS Fama was the Danish brig Fama, of fourteen guns, built in 1802, that the British captured in 1808. She was wrecked at the end of the year.

== Danish origins ==
Fama was built in Copenhagen to a design by F.C.H. Hohlenberg. She was the second of three vessels of the Brev Drageren-class and was launched in 1802.

In 1803 Fama, along with Søe-Ormen, was acting as a tender to the cadet training ship in the Great Belt. In 1804 her commander was Peter Frederik Wulff and she was the watch ship on the Elbe. In 1805 she was back with the home squadron. From 1806, until her capture in 1808, Fama was in the Great Belt serving as the cadet training ship.

== Capture ==
When word of the uprising of the Spanish against the French in 1808 reached Denmark, some 12,000 Spanish troops stationed in Denmark and under the Marquis de la Romana decided that they wished to leave French service and return to Spain. The Marquis contacted Rear-Admiral Keats, on Superb, who was in command of a small British squadron in the Kattegat. They agreed a plan and on 9 August 1808 the Spaniards seized the fort and town of Nyborg. Keats then prepared to take possession of the port and to organize the departure of the Spanish. Keats informed the Danish authorities that if they did not impede the operation he would spare the town. The Danes agreed, except for the captains of two small Danish warships in the harbour.

On 11 August Keats sent in the boats from Edgar, under the command of her captain, James Macnamara. The boats captured the Fama, of 18 guns and under the command of Otto Frederick Rasch, and the cutter Søormen, of 12 guns and under the command of Thøger Emil Rosenørn. Despite the odds Rasch and Rosenørn refused to surrender and put up a stiff resistance before they struck. (Note: Translation from the Danish websites and .) British losses were an officer killed and two men wounded; the Danes lost seven men killed and 13 wounded. Captain Rasch was made a prisoner of war and held at Reading for six months until release in February 1809. In 1847 the Admiralty authorized the issue of the Naval General Service Medal with clasp "11 Aug. Boat Service 1808" to all surviving claimants of the action.

The British organized the evacuation of the Spanish troops using some 50 or so local boats. Some 10,000 troops returned to Spain via Britain. (Note: Not all the Spaniards got away. Two squadrons of Spanish cavalry based as far away as Horsens on Jutland tried, on 10 August 1808, to make their way to Nyborg, but were stopped at the Little Belt crossing where Danish and French troops had reacted quickly to prevent further deserters crossing to the island of Funen.(from Danish website))

The British commissioned Fama under her existing name and on 7 November appointed Lieutenant Charles Topping to command her.

== Fate ==
On 22 December 1808, Fama left Karlskrona as part of the escort of the last British convoy of the year leaving the Baltic. She was in company with four other British warships - the frigate Salsette, the brig-sloop Magnet, the gun-brig Urgent, and the Salorman - three Swedish naval vessels and twelve merchant vessels. (Note: The Naval Chronicle lists the gun-brig as Ardent, but there was no gun-brig by that name and other sources give the name as Urgent. It is difficult to read the name of the cutter but it appears to be Sacorner.) Unfortunately, the convoy left after an unusually severe winter had set in. Furthermore, a storm coming from the north drove already formed ice onto the convoy.

On 23 December Fama ran aground on the northeastern point of the island of Bornholm in the Baltic. Lieutenant Topping, a crewman, and a woman died of exposure overnight. The next day the Danes passed lines to the brig. Although four men and a woman died trying to reach the shore, the Danes were able to rescue, and capture, the survivors. The subsequent court martial blamed the master for having altered course without notifying Topping and for having lost sight of Salsette. The board ordered that the master be reprimanded.

The convoy and its escorts were ill-fated, with Magnet and Salorman also being lost, as were most of the merchantmen, many of which the Danes captured or destroyed.
