= HDMS Søormen =

Cutter of the Royal Navy

History

Denmark-Norway
- Name: HDMS Søormen
- Builder: Stibolt, Bodenhofs plads
- Launched: 13 November 1789
- Captured: 11 August 1808

United Kingdom
- Name: HMS Salorman
- Acquired: 11 August 1808 (by capture)
- Fate: foundered 23 December 1809

General characteristics
- Type: Cutter
- Tons burthen: 121 (bm)
- Length: 68 Danish feet 2 Danish inches
- Beam: 21 Danish feet
- Draught: 9 Danish feet (laden); 7 Danish feet 3 Danish inches (unladen)
- Sail plan: Cutter
- Complement: 43 (Danish service)
- Armament: Danish service: 8 × 4-pounder guns + 4 × 12-pounder howitzers; British service: 10 guns

HDMS Søormen was a 12-gun cutter of the Royal Dano-Norwegian Navy, built in 1789. After being captured by the British in 1808 she was added to the Royal Navy as HMS Salorman. (Note: In British records her name also appears as Sacormen and Salomen.) She was wrecked in 1809.

== Construction and design ==
Søormen was built in Copenhagen to a design by Ernst Stibolt. She was launched on 13 November 1789. The name translate as "The Sea Worm".

== Danish service ==
Søeormen served throughout her nineteen years in the Great Belt off Nyborg, as a guardship in the 1790s and as a tender to the cadet training ship (along with Brevdrageren in 1801 and Fama in 1803) from 1801 to 1803.

Søormen was designated as a mail boat [hence the Danish "kongensbåd" or "kongenjagt" – king’s boat or king’s sloop – in the record], and armed for self-defence. Until August 1808 the Danes considered such vessels non-combatants. Captain Trampe, in command of a sister ship (Ørnen) in the postal service based in Korsør, was reprimanded for putting his ship in harm's way when he captured a British barge in the Great Belt later that month. However, Frederick VI of Denmark later approved Trampe's action.

In 1807–1809, she was used as a surveying ship.

== Capture ==
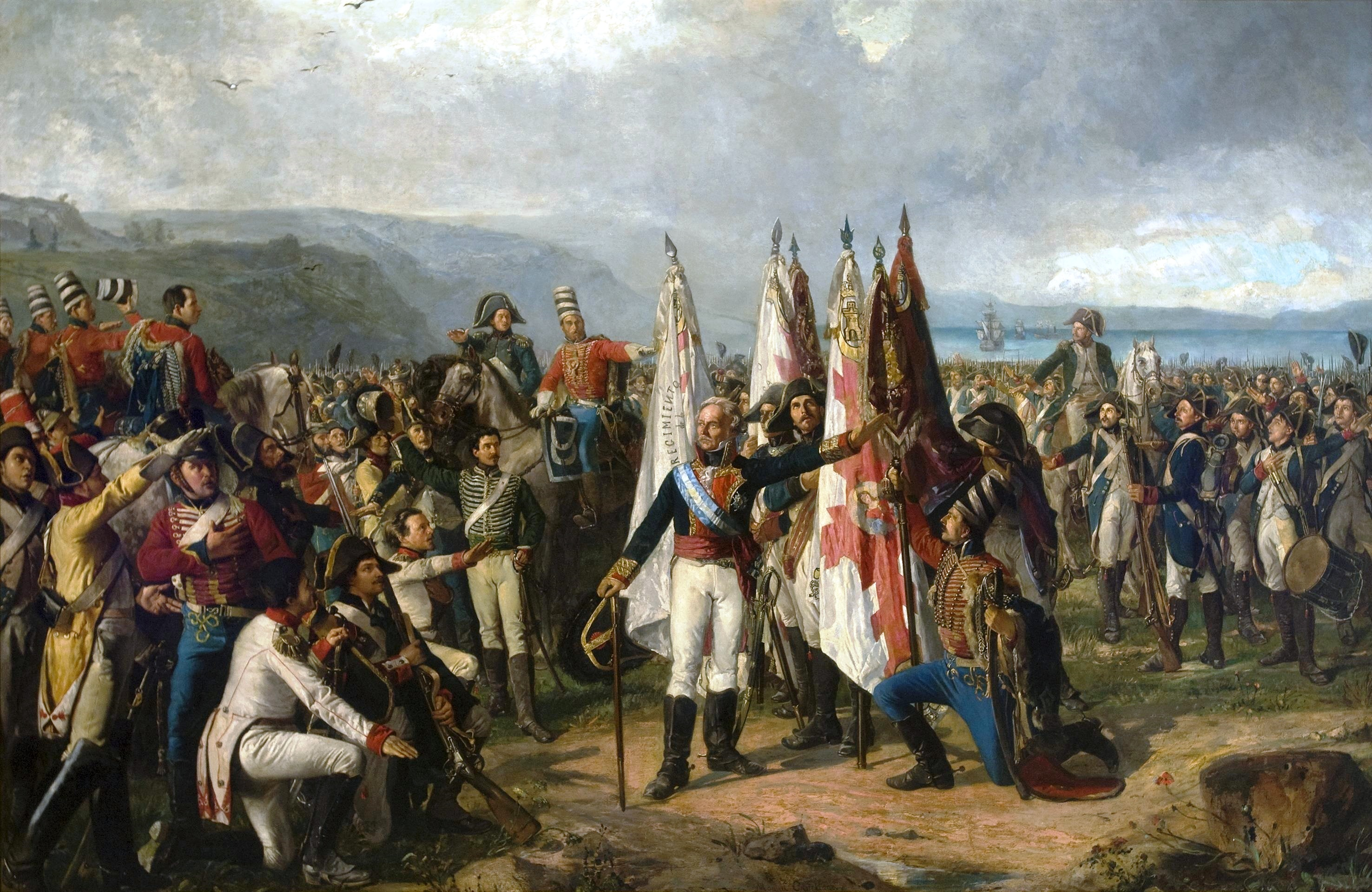
The Spanish Division of the North sent to fight the British in Denmark pledging to turn against France and side with the British

When word of the uprising of the Spanish against the French in 1808 reached Denmark, some 12,000 Spanish troops of the Division of the North stationed in Denmark and under the Marquis de la Romana decided that they wished to leave French service and return to Spain. The Marquis contacted Rear-Admiral Keats, on Superb, who was in command of a small British squadron in the Kattegat. They agreed a plan and on 9 August 1808 the Spaniards seized the fort and town of Nyborg. Keats then prepared to take possession of the port and to organize the departure of the Spanish. Keats informed the Danish authorities that if they did not impede the operation he would spare the town. The Danes agreed, except for the captains of two small Danish warships in the harbour.

On 11 August Keats sent in the boats from Edgar, under the command of her captain, James Macnamara. The boats captured the brig Fama, of 18 guns and under the command of Otto Frederick Rasch, and the cutter Søormen, of 12 guns and under the command of Thøger Emil Rosenørn. Despite the odds Rasch and Rosenørn decided to resist. (Note: Translation from the Danish websites and .) British losses were an officer killed and two men wounded; the Danes lost seven men killed and 13 wounded before they struck. In 1847 the Admiralty authorized the issue of the Naval General Service Medal with clasp "11 Aug. Boat Service 1808" to all surviving claimants of the action.

The British organized the evacuation of the Spanish troops using some 50 or so local boats. Some 10,000 troops returned to Spain via Britain. (Note: Not all the Spaniards got away. Two squadrons of Spanish cavalry based as far away as Horsens on Jutland tried, on 10 August 1808, to make their way to Nyborg, but were stopped at the Little Belt crossing where Danish and French troops had reacted quickly to prevent further deserters crossing to the island of Funen.(From Danish website))

The British commissioned the cutter under the name Salorman and appointed Lieutenant Andrew Duncan to command her.

== Fate ==
On 22 December 1808, Salorman was part of the escort of the last British convoy of the year leaving the Baltic. She was in company with four other British warships - the frigate Salsette, the brig-sloop Fama, the brig-sloop Magnet, and the gun-brig Urgent - three Swedish naval vessels and twelve merchant vessels. (Note: The Naval Chronicle lists the gun-brig as Ardent, but there was no gun-brig by that name and other sources give the name as Urgent. It is difficult to read the name of the cutter but it appears to be Sacorner.) Unfortunately, the convoy left after an unusually severe winter had set in. Furthermore, a storm coming from the north drove already formed ice onto the convoy.

A storm damaged Salorman's yards and rigging and washed one man overboard. Duncan steered her towards Ystad, Sweden, but a blinding snowstorm developed that obliterated the sight of land. She grounded at about 4 am on 23 December, a little east of Ystad. In the morning boats came out from the town and salvaged what they could. By nightfall it was clear that Salorman was unrecoverable and her crew abandoned her. Next morning she was discovered to be full of water up to her gunwales.

The convoy and its escorts were ill-fated, with Magnet and Fama also being lost, as were most of the merchantmen, many of which the Danes captured or destroyed.

== Citations ==
- Individual record cards in Danish for ships of the Danish Royal Navy can often (but not always) be found at the internet site Orlogmuseet Skibregister. The Danish Naval Museum has a website at which details, drawings and models may be available. For individual ships already listed, including Søe-Ormen, see here.

=== References ===
- Hepper, David J. (1994). British Warship Losses in the Age of Sail, 1650–1859. Rotherfield: Jean Boudriot. ISBN 0-948864-30-3.
- Long, William H. (1895). Medals of the British navy and how they were won: with a list of those officers, who for their gallant conduct were granted honorary swords and plate by the Committee of the Patriotic Fund. London: Norie & Wilson.
- Mayo, John Horsley (1897) Medals and decorations of the British Army and Navy. (John Constable).
- Ross, Sir John (1838) Memoirs and correspondence of Admiral Lord De Saumarez: From original papers in possession of the family. (R. Bentley)
- Winfield, Rif (2008). British Warships in the Age of Sail 1793–1817: Design, Construction, Careers and Fates. Seaforth. ISBN 1-86176-246-1.
- (in Danish)T. A. Topsøe-Jensen og Emil Marquard (1935) "Officerer i den dansk-norske Søetat 1660-1814 og den danske Søetat 1814-1932". (Danish Naval Officers) Two volumes. Download here.
