= Evacuation of La Romana's division =

1808 evacuation during the Peninsular War

- Part of the Peninsular War
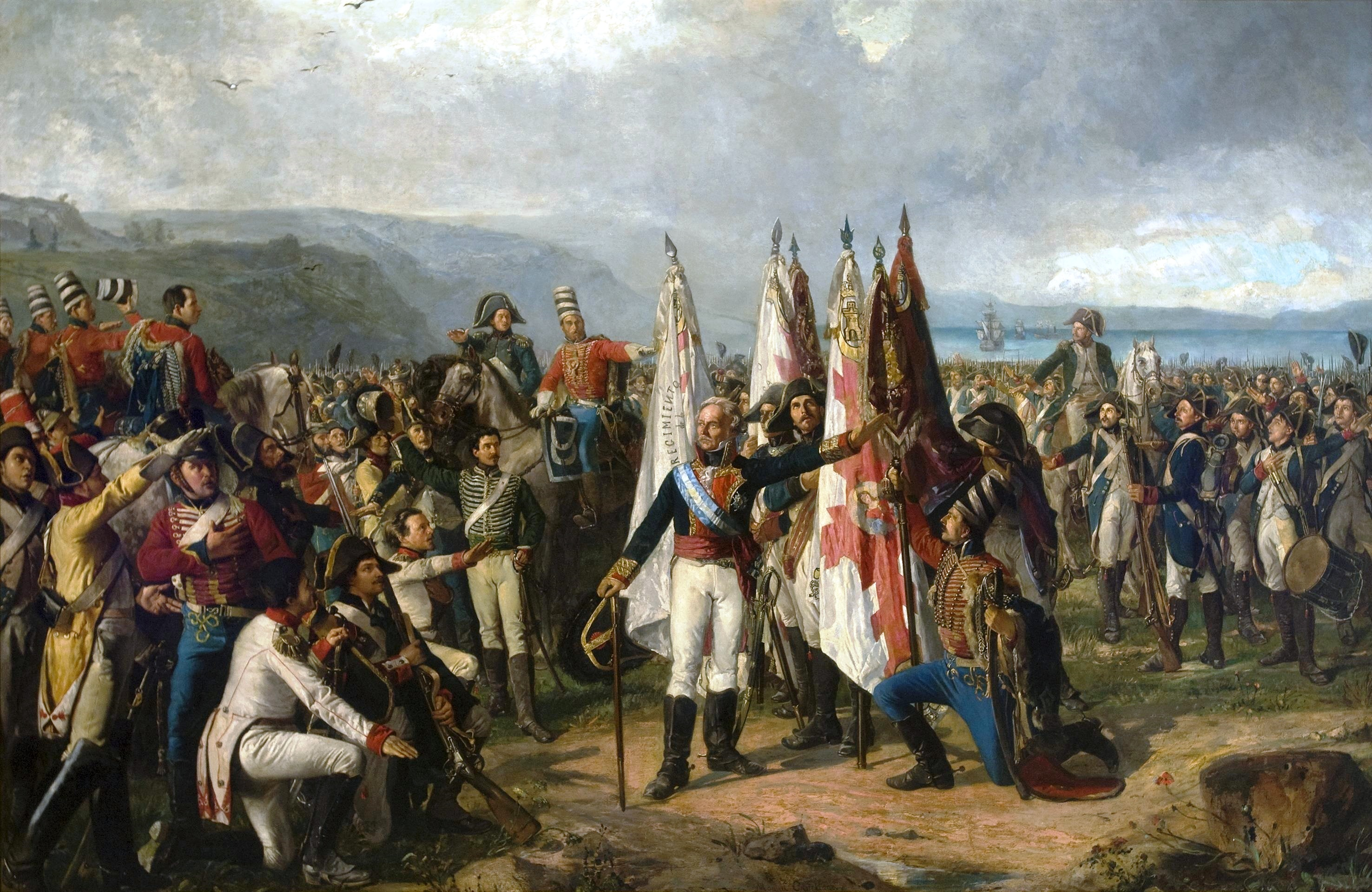
- The oath of the troops of the Marquis of La Romana; Manuel Castellano, 1870
Date	August 1808
Location	Denmark–Norway 43°27′46″N 3°48′18″W
Result	Anglo-Spanish victory

Belligerents
(First French Empire) French Empire; Denmark–Norway	Spain; (United Kingdom of Great Britain and Ireland) United Kingdom

Commanders and leaders
(First French Empire) Jean-Baptiste Bernadotte	Marquis of La Romana; Richard Keats

Strength
30,000	13,500

Casualties and losses
None	4,500 captured

Peninsular War: Spanish uprising 1808
current battle

The evacuation of La Romana's division in August 1808 was a military operation in which a division of troops belonging to the Kingdom of Spain and commanded by Pedro Caro, Marquis of La Romana defected from the armies of the First French Empire. The Spanish troops were part of the Imperial forces in Denmark, which were under the leadership of Marshal Jean-Baptiste Bernadotte. Most of the Spanish troops were successfully evacuated by the British navy and shipped to Santander, Spain to fight against France in the Peninsular War.

In 1807, the Spanish Division of the North was sent to northern Europe to participate in the planned Franco-Danish invasion of Sweden. Formerly loyal to the alliance with Imperial France, the Spanish officers and men found in 1808 that Emperor Napoleon I of France had overthrown King Charles IV of Spain and Prince Ferdinand and placed his brother Joseph Bonaparte on the Spanish throne. The British sent an agent, James Robertson, to contact La Romana and found that the general desired to escape from Denmark. On 23 July 1808, the admiralty sent secret instructions with Spanish envoy Don Rafael Lobo on the fast sailing Musquito to Commodore Richard Goodwin Keats commanding in the Belt and Sound requiring him to open negotiations with the Spanish commander for evacuation of his troops. Through lengthy secret correspondence, Keats and La Romana arranged a secret plan for the Spanish troops to be assembled at Nyborg and evacuated by the British fleet.

Keats directed his ships to the harbor, seized 57 boats for use as transport, transferring troops to nearby Langeland in anticipation of stores and transports arriving from England. One cavalry and two infantry regiments failed to get away and remained in Napoleon's power. But in August 1808, most units were able to make their way to the rendezvous with the British navy.

Fearful of the French Army advancing from the west, and with no word of the promised transports, the troops were re-embarked and the convoy sailed for Gothenburg. Transports arrived on 6 September and after a three-week voyage in stormy conditions about 9,000 Spanish troops disembarked at Santander in October 1808 and had a chance to fight against the French.

== Prelude ==
In 1806, Spain was an ally of Emperor Napoleon's First French Empire. After all, it was the combined fleets of France and Spain that were defeated by the British at the Battle of Trafalgar in 1805. At this time, Manuel de Godoy, Prince of the Peace was a favorite of King Charles IV of Spain, enjoying great influence. At the start of the War of the Fourth Coalition, which pitted the Kingdom of Prussia against Napoleon, Godoy issued a proclamation that was obviously aimed at France, even though it did not specify an enemy. After Napoleon's decisive victory at the Battle of Jena-Auerstedt, Godoy quickly withdrew the proclamation. But it was too late to avert the emperor's suspicion. From that moment, Napoleon planned to deal with his inconstant ally at some future time. In the meantime, the French emperor dragooned Godoy and Charles IV into providing a division of Spanish troops to serve in northern Europe.

In March 1807, 15,000 Spanish troops set out for northern Europe under the command of La Romana. Altogether, there were 14 battalions of foot soldiers and five regiments of horses. Their first destination was Hamburg. La Romana's Division served under Marshal Guillaume Brune at the Siege of Stralsund which ended on 20 August 1807 when the Swedish garrison evacuated the city. Brune commanded 40,000 troops from France, the Kingdom of Holland, the Kingdom of Italy, the Grand Duchy of Baden, and some lesser German states. The Spanish contingent included 9,763 infantry, 2,340 cavalry in 12 squadrons, 324 gunners in four-foot artillery batteries, and 104 sappers. The besiegers lost 998 men killed, wounded, missing, or died from disease. Spanish casualties are unknown.

The Division of the North spent the winter of 1807–1808 in Swedish Pomerania, Mecklenburg, and towns of the old Hanseatic League. In early 1808, the Spanish troops marched into Denmark. According to an 1808 state of the army, the line infantry regiments each had three battalions of four companies and their strengths were, Asturias (2,103), Guadalajara (2,069), Princesa (1,969), and Zamora (2,096). The light infantry regiments each consisted of one battalion of six companies and their numbers were, 1st of Barcelona (1,266) and 1st of Catalonia (1,164). The heavy cavalry regiments each counted five squadrons and their strengths were, Rey Nr. 1 (634), Infante Nr. 4 (615), and Algarve Nr. 9 (572). The Light Cavalry also had five squadrons; Almanza Nr. 3 (598) and Villaviciosa Nr. 5 (628).

The Division of the North came under the command of Marshal Jean-Baptiste Bernadotte who was tasked with defending the southwestern shore of the Baltic Sea. In addition to La Romana's forces, the marshal controlled 30,000 Danish troops plus French and Dutch units. Napoleon, whose plans to seize Spain were well advanced, made sure that the Spanish units were spread out so that it would be difficult to assemble them in one place. Furthermore, Danish troops were always posted nearby.

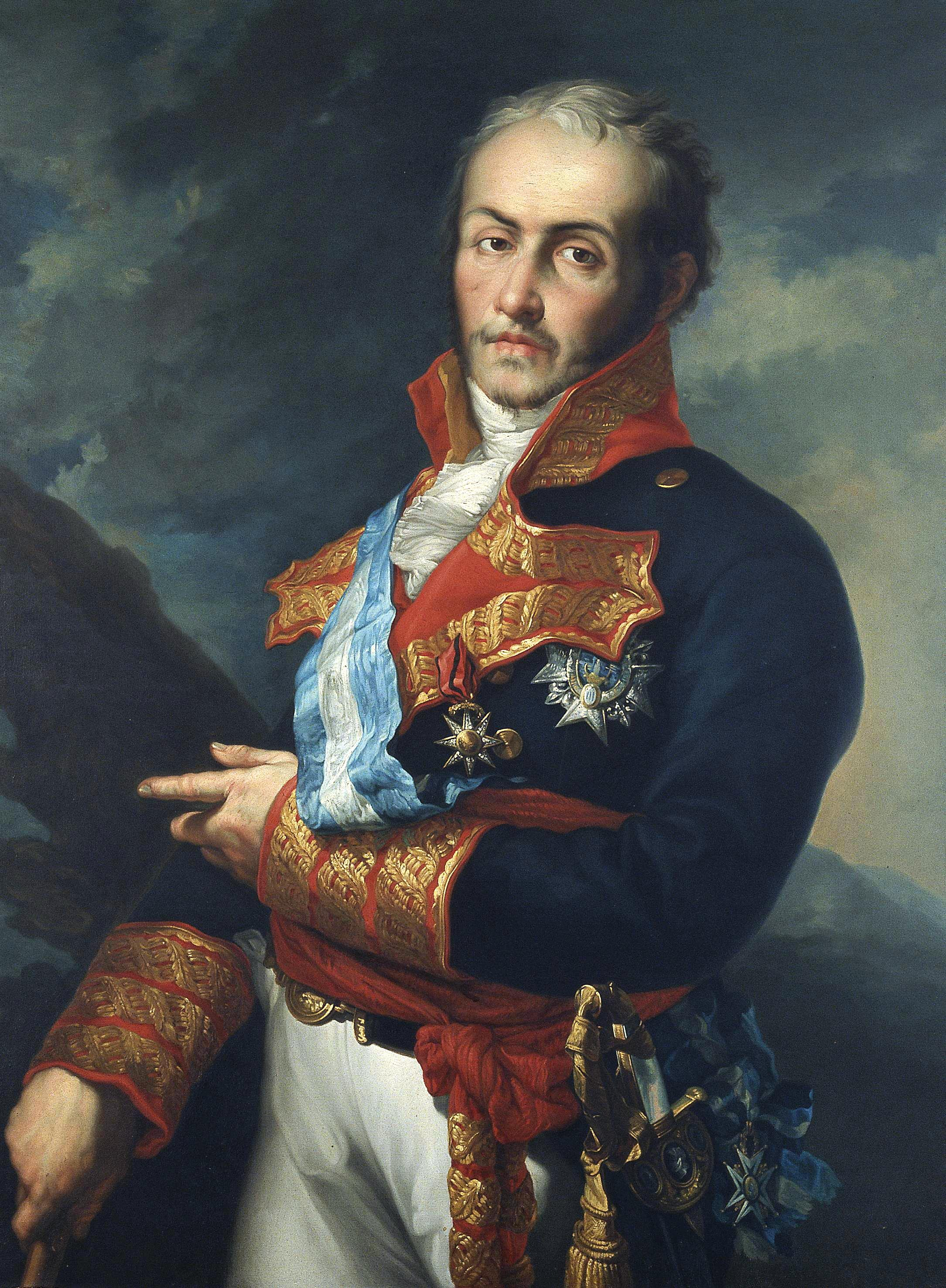
Pedro Caro y Sureda, Marquis of La Romana.

The 4,000 men of the Asturias and Guadalajara Regiments were stationed near Roskilde on the island of Zealand (Sjælland). The 4,500-strong Princesa, 1st of Barcelona, Almanza, and Villaviciosa Regiments were posted on the island of Funen (Fyn) along with La Romana's headquarters which were at Nyborg. The 1st of Catalonia Regiment was quartered on Langeland. The Algarve, Infante, Rey, and Zamora Regiments were stationed at Aarhus (Århus), Fredericia, and Randers on Jutland. Watching the various Spanish contingents were the main Danish army in Zealand, 3,000 Danes at Odense on Funen, 800 Danes, and a company of French on Langeland, and a Dutch light cavalry brigade and Danish infantry on Jutland. To keep the soldiers quiet, Napoleon increased the officers' pay and promised La Romana the Grand Cross of the Légion d'Honneur. In order to flatter the Spaniards, Bernadotte used a troop of the Rey Regiment as his personal escort.

During the spring, the French authorities began intercepting the dispatches between La Romana and the Spanish government. However, they failed to stop a Spanish officer who arrived in April with a message protesting that 15 messages had been sent from Spain without a reply from the Division of the North. At last, La Romana and his officers became aware of the French seizure of Barcelona, Figueras, and Pamplona in March. Soon afterward came the tidings of the Dos de Mayo Uprising. Nearly all of the officers and men were infuriated by the news but realized that they were encompassed by enemies and far from home. On 24 June, La Romana learned that Joseph Bonaparte had been proclaimed king. One of his staff officers, Joseph O'Donnell noted, "The more they tried to persuade us that Spain was tranquil, and had settled down to enjoy an age of felicity under Napoleon, the more clearly did we foresee the scenes of blood, strife, and disaster which were to follow these incredible events."

== Espionage ==
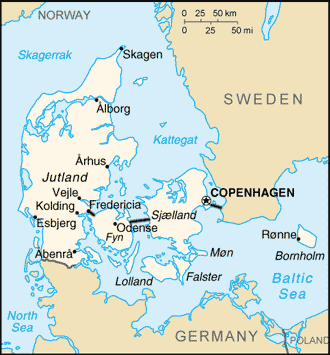
Denmark map shows Sjaelland (Zealand) and Fyn (Funen) and towns of Århus and Fredericia. Langeland is the long, narrow island between Fyn and Lolland.

After the outbreak of the Peninsular War, the British government desired to get in touch with the Division of the North to see whether its soldiers wished to fight against Napoleon. An authority consulted Francisco Javier Castaños, who assured him that the troops would do so. Since the British navy totally dominated the Baltic Sea it was feasible to pick up the Spaniards if only they could reach the coast. First, an agent had to brave Napoleon's secret police in order to get in touch with La Romana. Luckily, Sir Arthur Wellesley had suggested such a person to British Foreign Secretary George Canning before departing to command the army in Portugal that went on to win the Battle of Vimeiro in August 1808.

James Robertson was a Roman Catholic priest who was born in Scotland but spent much of his life in a monastery in Regensberg, Germany. He went to England where he took employment as a tutor to an aristocratic family. While there, he let Wellesley know that he was willing to serve the British government in its struggle against Napoleon's empire. Canning contacted Robertson who accepted the mission to get in touch with La Romana. The spy was introduced into Europe via a smuggling ship that passed from Heligoland to Bremerhaven. Finding that the Spaniards were no longer in the vicinity of the Hanseatic towns, Robertson traveled north into Denmark, posing as a German merchant of chocolate and cigars, which were contraband goods.

Robertson made his way to Nyborg and introduced himself to La Romana with his chocolate and cigars, which he knew were especially desired by the Spanish officers. As soon as he and the Spanish general were in private, Robertson revealed his mission. He knew it was possible that La Romana might turn him over to Napoleon's police to be hanged as a spy. At first, the Spaniard regarded Robertson as a likely French agent trying to test his loyalty. Finally, the priest convinced La Romana that he was working for the British government. The general admitted that he was dismayed by his position and certain that Napoleon's intentions toward Spain were bad.

The Scottish priest then revealed the plan for the British navy to evacuate the Division of the North from Denmark and land it at any location in the Spanish empire that La Romana wanted to go. After talking it over with his staff, the Spanish general told Robertson of his desire to go ahead with the operation. Soon afterward, the plan nearly miscarried when the Scot was picked up by a Danish patrol while attempting to signal a British warship off Funen. The priest managed to talk his way out of the situation but there is considerable doubt as to whether he was able to get his message to a British vessel.

On 23 July 1808 the Admiralty sent Spanish envoy Lobo together with secret instructions via the fast sailing Musquito to Commodore Keats commanding in the Belt and Sound, requiring he open communications with the Spanish commander with a view to evacuating the Northern Army. The mission was described as being of the greatest importance. Lobo arrived on Keats's flagship HMS Superb on 5 August, and with the aid of an officer named Frabreques who had escaped to the British fleet, a plan was formulated and secret communication opened with La Romana proposing a means by which, with his limited resources, Keats could safely remove, accommodate and feed some ten thousand men. The plan was to temporarily encamp on the nearby island of Langeland, thought to be the most capable of providing sufficient food and defensible against an advancing French Army until victuallers and transports arrived from England.

== Escape ==
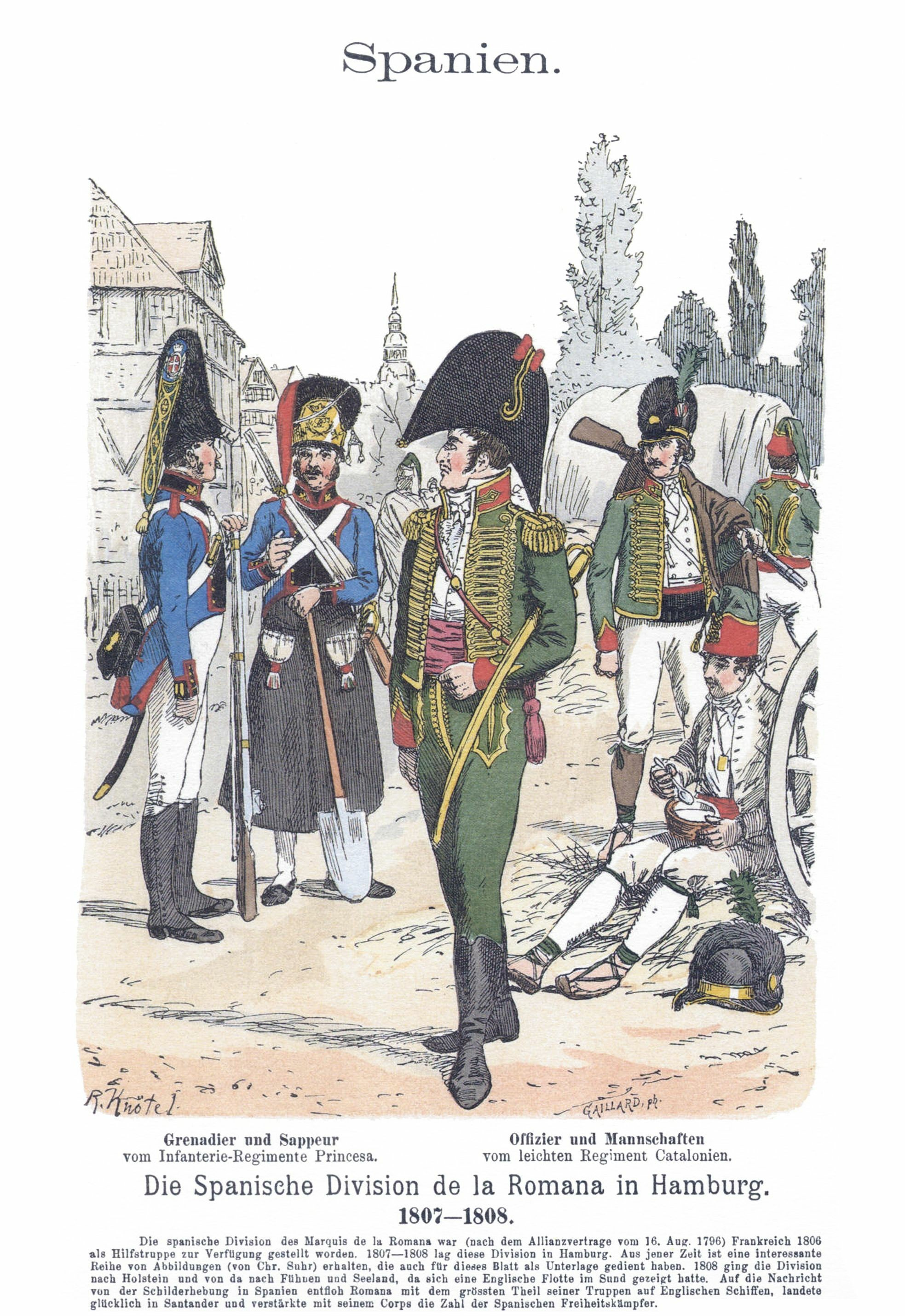
Princesa Line Infantry Regt (left); Catalonia Light Infantry Regt (right)

La Romana let a few trusted subordinates into the secret. However, the plan was not confined to the pro-French Brigadier General Jean de Kindelan on Jutland. In order for the evacuation to be a success, La Romana needed to concentrate his scattered troops and seize the nearby ports when the British fleet was close by. The initial strategy was to assemble all the Spanish troops in one place for a grand review for Marshal Bernadotte. This plot was not carried out because orders arrived from France that all Spanish soldiers were required to swear an oath of loyalty to King Joseph Bonaparte. The troops on Jutland and Funen took the oath, their officers ignoring when the soldiers swore allegiance to Prince Ferdinand rather than to Joseph. However, on Zealand, there was a full-scale mutiny on 31 July in which an aide de camp to General François Nicolas Fririon was killed. The next day, the Asturias and Guadalajara Regiments were surrounded by superior numbers of Danish troops and compelled to surrender. Thereafter, the soldiers were interned in small groups.

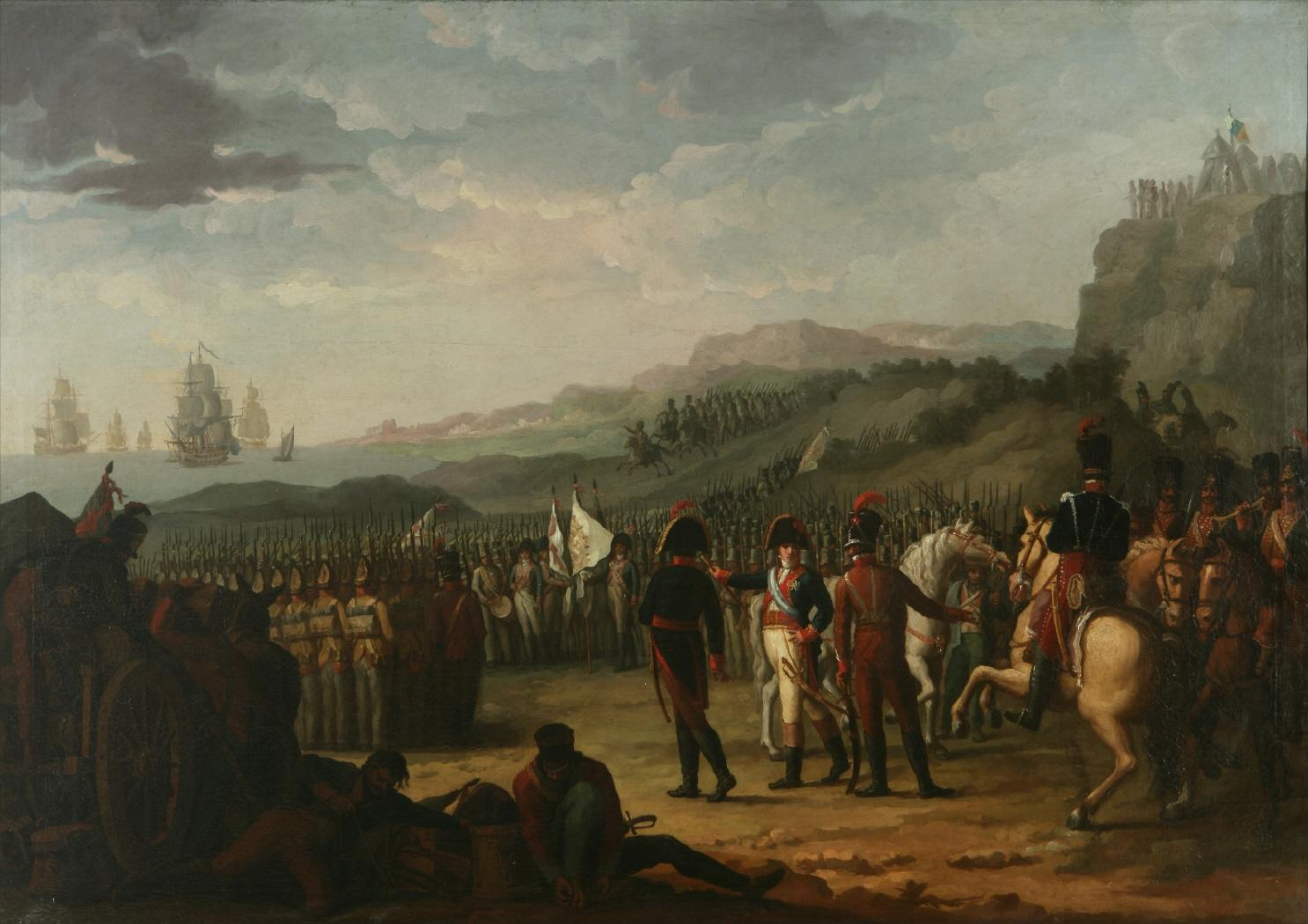
Spanish troops under General La Romana embarking for Spain, 1808

This incident alarmed Bernadotte, but before he could take stronger measures, the news reached La Romana that Rafael Lobo, an agent of the Spanish Junta had arrived offshore. Lobo indicated that the British fleet was en route, so the Spanish general got the word to his subordinates that it was time to execute the plan. The Spanish troops on Funen seized the port of Nyborg on 7 August. The only resistance was from two Danish vessels in the harbor—the brig Fama and the smaller Søe-Ormen—which were attacked by boats from HMS Edgar and overwhelmed. The next day, the soldiers on Jutland commandeered some small craft at Fredericia and Aarhus and sailed to Funen. The Infante, Rey, and Zamora Regiments were successfully evacuated, but the colonel of the Algarve regiment refused to budge. Finally, the senior captain put the plan into motion but it was too late. Finally aware of the plot, Kindelan rode to a nearby French camp and told them what was going on. A brigade of Dutch hussars intercepted the Algarve Regiment and forced their surrender; the senior captain then killed himself.

By this time La Romana had 8,000 Spanish soldiers assembled on Funen. The badly outnumbered Danish contingent at Odense did not engage La Romana's force. Keats seized some 57 small craft from within the harbour of Nyborg and embarked the Spanish troops. As they headed for open waters they were joined by the boats carrying the regiments from Aarhus under the protection of the brig Snipe. Between 9 and 11 August, the troops on Funen sailed across to Langeland where the 1st of Catalonia had overpowered the Danish garrison.

La Romana's 9,000 Spanish troops waited at Langeland until 21 August. By then gunfire could be heard as the French advanced from the west. It was no longer prudent to wait for the promised transports and Keats directed the troops be reembarked on the ships he had to hand, including the small vessels seized from Nyborg and some more he had cut from passing convoys for the purpose. By 23 August the convoy was on its way to Gothenburg, Sweden, and shortly had the good fortune to be met by victuallers sent from England.

In time the promised convoy of some thirty-five transports arrived and on 9 September troops were reembarked for the journey to return to their homeland. The squadron sailed to Santander where they deposited La Romana's troops by 11 October. The foot soldiers immediately prepared to fight while the cavalrymen marched to Extremadura, where they were to collect horses.

== Aftermath ==
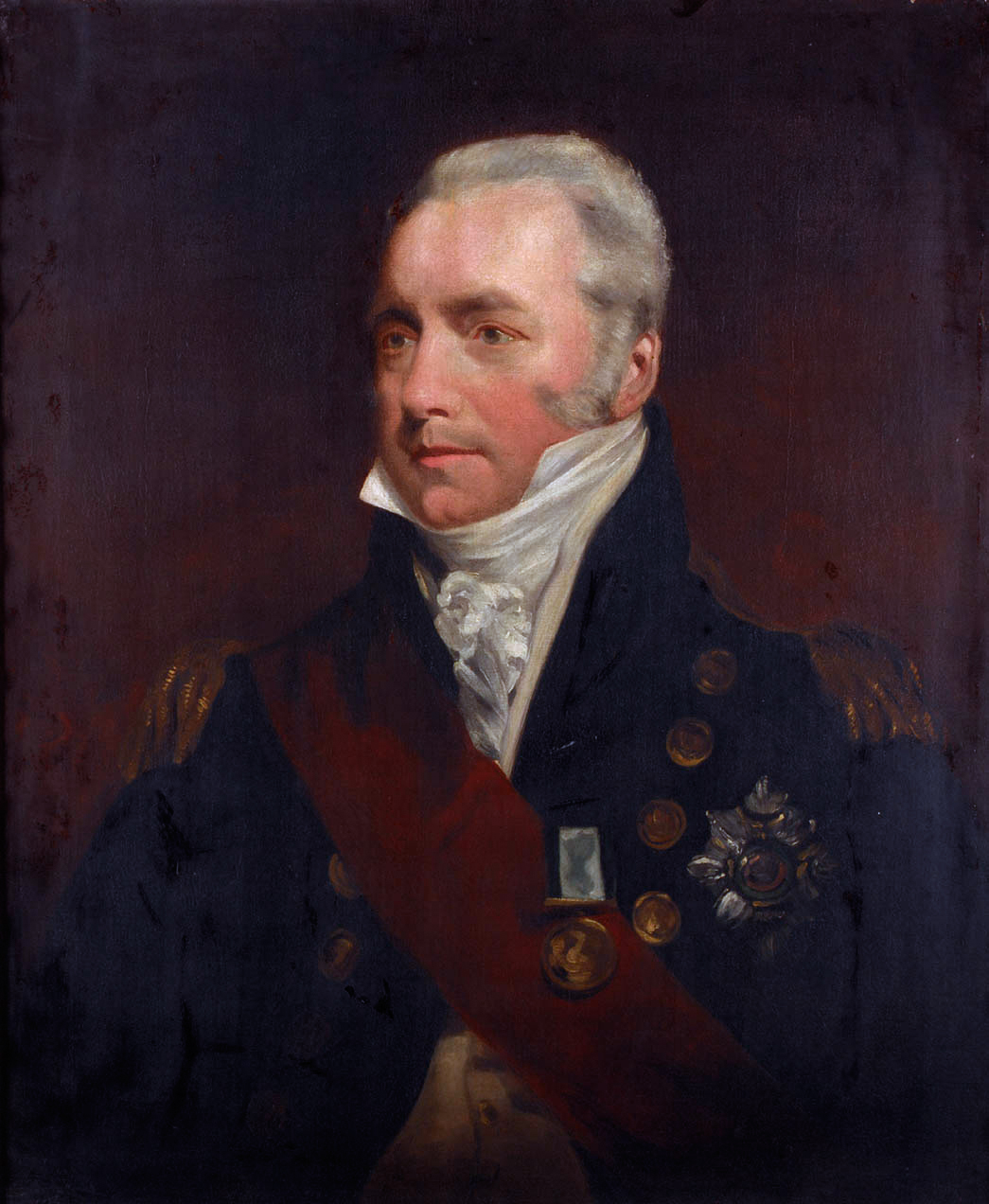
Admiral Keats

When the troops arrived at Santander, La Romana formed the infantry into the 5th Division of the Army of Galicia and placed the Conde de San Roman in command. The division was ordered to join Joaquín Blake's army but only the 1st of Catalonia with 1,066 men arrived in time to participate in the Battle of Zornoza on 31 October 1808. The 5th Division formed the army's rear guard during the subsequent retreat. The French pursuit was so aggressive that San Roman reported to his army commander that he was about to be cut off, so Blake offered battle on 10 November. In the two-day Battle of Espinosa de los Monteros the 5,294-strong division repulsed several French attacks on the first day and suffered about 1,000 casualties including San Roman. A month later, the 5th Division still counted 3,953 bayonets.

The soldiers from the regiments that were not successfully evacuated were employed in the French invasion of Russia and fought at the Battle of Borodino on 7 September 1812. The 2nd and 3rd Battalions of the Joseph Napoleon Regiment formed part of Louis Friant's 2nd Division of the I Corps while the 1st and 4th Battalions fought with Jean-Baptiste Broussier's 14th Division of the IV Corps. As many as 4,000 Spaniards were captured during the retreat from Russia and were handed over to the British Royal Navy at Kronstadt for repatriation to Spain.

Before being repatriated, those 4,000 Spaniards deserted from the Grande Armée on 7 September and then fought for the Imperial Russian Army, having the privilege of serving in the Imperial Guard at the court of St. Petersburg, and obtained its own national battalion called "Imperial Regiment Alexander" on 2 May 1813. Then a ceremony of delivery and oath of allegiance to the flags was held before the Spanish ambassador in Russia, Francisco Cea Bermúdez. The flag of this regiment had the Cross of Saint Andrew, symbol of the Spanish Army, in its center, while in its corners it had four imperial eagles from the Coat of arms of Russia, being embroidered by Empresses Elizabeth Alexseievna and Maria Feodorovna (mother of the Tsar Alexander I of Russia, who ordered that all Spaniards not be treated as prisoners). When they integrated to the Spanish Army in August 1813, they were called "Moscovites", quartering in Astorga. Then the unit was dissolved in 1823 by Ferdinand VII due to being too liberal, changing its name.

Keats's conduct of the complex logistical operation was highly regarded; the rescue of the troops was considered as equal to a victory in battle, as it demonstrated to Britain's enemies the capacity of her navy to successfully execute foreign policy, and to move and support large numbers of troops where they were needed overseas. Keats was awarded the Order of the Bath and at the King's request took as his motto that of La Romana's regiment "Mi Patria Es Mi Norte".

== See also ==
- Timeline of the Peninsular War
