= Jean de Kindelan =

Spanish army officer (1759–1812)

- Born: 7 December 1759; Pontevedra, Spain
- Died: 13 November 1822 (aged 62) Paris, France
- Allegiance: Spain; France
- Branch: Infantry
- Service years: Spain 1769–1808; France 1808–1814
- Rank: General of Division
- Conflicts: Evacuation of the La Romana Division (1808); Peninsular War (1812–1813)
- Awards: Légion d'Honneur, 1808

Jean de Kindelan (7 December 1759 – 13 November 1822) was a Spanish brigadier general who commanded Joseph Napoleon's Regiment in northern Europe 1809 – 1812 when it formed part of Napoleon's left flank. His known pro-French sympathies led to his not being informed of the plot for the escape of the Spanish troops stranded there after Napoleon replaced the Spanish king Ferdinand VII with his elder brother Joseph Bonaparte.

== Early life ==
Juan Kindelán y O'Regan was born in Pontevedra, Galicia (Spain), in 1759 (the year of his birth is reported by some sources as 1755) and died in Paris in 1822. He was the son of Vicente Kindelán Luttrell of Lubrellitorn and Maria Francisca O’Regan. His father was an Irishman who settled in Spain and joined the infantry of the Royal Spanish Army, attaining the positions of Brigadier and military governor of Zamora. His mother came from Barcelona but was probably of Irish descent. Juan (called Jean during his French service) had a brother, Sebastian Kindelán, and a sister, Maria de la Concepcion Kindelán O'Regan.

== Career ==
Kindelan was an infantry cadet at age 10 and held the rank of captain in the Spanish Army at age 20. On 5 October 1802, Kindelan was appointed general of brigade, on 2 May 1809 he was made Colonel of the Joseph Napoleon Regiment, and on 28 May 1812 he was made general of division in the service of France.

In 1807, the Bourbon monarchs of Spain sent an expeditionary force from the regular Spanish Army to northern Europe to serve with the French La Grande Armée. The expeditionary force, the Division of the North, was commanded by Marquis de la Romana, with Kindelan as second in command. The Spanish expeditionary force participated in the siege of the Swedish fortress of Stralsund in late 1807, and was then broken up and stationed in different parts of Denmark. Kindelan was brevetted Lieutenant-General of the French Royal Army when he was decorated with the Legion d’Honneur on 22 June 1808.

The Spanish expeditionary force was still in Denmark in the summer of 1808, when news of the recent events in Spain arrived. The Bourbons of Spain had been forced to abdicate and Napoleon proclaimed his brother, Joseph Bonaparte, as King of Spain on 6 June 1808. Napoleon’s invasion of Portugal and overthrowing of the Spanish monarchs would result in conflict between France and Portugal, Spain, and Great Britain in the Iberian Peninsula until 1814, which became known as the Peninsular War.

When the Peninsular War broke out, La Romana made plans with the British to repatriate his men to Spain. The success of the evacuation of the La Romana Division was chiefly credited to his subterfuge and resourcefulness. At least 9,000 men of the 15,000-strong division were immediately able to board British ships on 27 August and escape to Spain.

In the autumn of 1808 Napoleon considered the possibility of using Spanish regiments to serve with French troops in the Peninsular War; these would later become part of King Joseph Bonaparte’s army. General de Kindelan, second in command of the former Spanish expeditionary force, had not participated in the escape plot and swore allegiance to Joseph Bonaparte, brother of Napoleon and reluctant pretender to the throne of Spain. Kindelan supported the premise that among the 3,500 Spanish prisoners, there were enough men who would accept the new ruler of Spain to provide a nucleus for a new military unit for service on the French side of what the Spanish called the Guerra de la Independencia Española (Spanish War of Independence), and it fell to his lot to organise this body of soldiers into a regiment. He commanded the Joseph Napoleon Regiment from 13 February 1809 until 19 January 1812.

Kindelan died on 13 November 1822.
