= Alessandro Trivulzio (Italian statesman) =

Italian general and politician (1773–1805)

- Nineteenth-century portrait of Trivulzio

Minister of War of the Italian Republic
- In office 22 February 1802 – 31 August 1804
- President: Napoleon Bonaparte
- Preceded by: Office established
- Succeeded by: Domenico Pino

Personal details
- Born: 19 March 1773 Milan, Duchy of Milan
- Died: 2 March 1805 (aged 31) Paris, First French Empire
- Parents: Giorgio Teodoro Trivulzio (father); Maria Cristina Cicogna Mozzoni (mother)
- Relatives: House of Trivulzio
- Awards: Legion of Honour

Military service
- Allegiance: Cisalpine Republic; Italian Republic
- Rank: General of division
- Battles/wars: Siege of Genoa (1800)

Alessandro Trivulzio (19 March 1773 – 2 March 1805), also known as Alessandro Trivulzi, was an Italian general and politician who served as Minister of War of the Italian Republic from 1802 to 1804. A member of the aristocratic House of Trivulzio of Milan, he supported the republican movement following the French invasion of Lombardy and pursued a military career under Napoleon Bonaparte.

Trivulzio commanded the National Guard of Milan, served in the armed forces of the Cisalpine Republic and participated in the defence of Genoa in 1800. As Minister of War, he worked on the reorganisation of the Italian republican army, military conscription and the development of military educational institutions. In 1804 he was appointed commander of the Italian division attached to the French Army of the Coasts of the Ocean, which was preparing for Napoleon's proposed invasion of Britain. He died in Paris in March 1805.

His career has been reassessed by modern historians as an example of the transformation of the Italian aristocracy during the revolutionary and Napoleonic period, particularly the conflict between inherited noble loyalties and republican political ideals.

== Early life and family ==
Alessandro Trivulzio was born in Milan on 19 March 1773, the eldest son of Giorgio Teodoro Trivulzio and Maria Cristina Cicogna Mozzoni. His father was a member of the Milanese patriciate and held the title of Marquis of Sesto Ulteriano. Alessandro's siblings included Gian Giacomo, Girolamo and Maria Margherita.

The Trivulzio family was among the most prominent noble houses of Lombardy and had maintained connections with successive governments of the Duchy of Milan. Alessandro grew up in the family's residence in Piazza Sant'Alessandro, where he received a conventional aristocratic education from private tutors.

His family was closely associated with the Habsburg establishment. His father had been appointed chamberlain and gentleman of the bedchamber to Empress Maria Theresa in 1770. Alessandro also received an appointment as chamberlain during the Bohemian coronation celebrations of Emperor Francis II in 1792.

The family maintained important literary and antiquarian collections. Although Alessandro did not develop the same degree of bibliographical interest as his younger brother Gian Giacomo, archival documents indicate that he was interested in scholarly reading. In 1793 he sought ecclesiastical permission to consult certain prohibited books.

== Military career ==
=== Republican sympathies and the National Guard ===
The French occupation of Milan in May 1796 marked a fundamental change in Trivulzio's political and professional life. While much of his family remained attached to the Austrian political order, Alessandro embraced the republican government introduced by the French.

His father withdrew to Varese after the occupation, but Alessandro remained in Milan and entered the newly organised civic militia. In September 1796 he declined an offer of municipal office, explaining that he preferred military service and had already accepted a captaincy in the National Guard.

He was subsequently appointed battalion commander in the Porta Ticinese district of Milan. On 5 January 1797, Bonaparte personally selected him as commander of the National Guard of Milan, independently of the municipal authorities.

In this position Trivulzio was responsible for reorganising the civic militia and maintaining public order. He worked closely with Pietro Teulié, who became one of his principal military associates.

Bonaparte's confidence in Trivulzio was reflected in his subsequent appointment to the military committee of the Cisalpine administration in July 1797. The committee was involved in organising the armed forces of the emerging republic.

=== Service in the Cisalpine army ===
In August 1797 Trivulzio relinquished command of the National Guard and entered the Cisalpine military establishment as an adjutant-general.

During the following years he held several staff appointments, including service with the division of Romagna, the forces in the Department of the Mincio and French formations operating in the Maritime Alps.

His duties involved military administration, recruitment and the organisation of local forces. Contemporary reports described his conduct favourably, particularly in Romagna, where the implementation of recruitment measures encountered popular opposition.

In 1800 Trivulzio participated in the defence of Genoa under the French general André Masséna. After the French victory at the Battle of Marengo, he was appointed inspector of Cisalpine troops with the rank of brigadier general.

Documents dated 5 and 6 July 1800 record his appointment to this position, which was made under the authority of the restored republican administration.

== Minister of War ==
=== Appointment and political context ===
Following the transformation of the Cisalpine Republic into the Italian Republic in January 1802, Trivulzio was appointed Minister of War on 22 February 1802. The appointment and the subsequent succession of ministers are recorded in the official historical inventory of the Milan State Archives. The selection was supported by Francesco Melzi d'Eril, vice-president of the republic, who believed that Trivulzio possessed the impartiality and personal integrity necessary to administer a ministry affected by factional rivalry. Melzi considered several possible candidates, including Ambrogio Birago, Giovanni Battista Guastavillani, Giuseppe Lechi and Domenico Pino, but regarded each as politically or administratively problematic. Trivulzio was considered a compromise candidate whose established military reputation, aristocratic background and commitment to the republic might enable him to exercise authority over competing groups of officers. Initially Melzi expressed satisfaction with the appointment. In his correspondence with Bonaparte in April 1802, he praised the new minister's honesty, judgement and acceptance within the army. However, their relationship deteriorated as disagreements developed over the management of military affairs.

=== Administration of the army ===
Trivulzio inherited a military administration affected by financial difficulties, political interference and disputes over the authority of the ministry. The Ministry of War was divided into several administrative departments responsible for military personnel, artillery and engineering, military supplies and financial administration. In July 1802 a Council of War Administration was established, and subsequent decrees altered the division of responsibilities between the council and the ministry. The wider political objective of the Italian republican government was to strengthen its own armed forces while remaining within the French sphere of influence. Trivulzio continued administrative reforms begun under his predecessor Pietro Teulié, with whom he maintained extensive correspondence. His work included reorganising the central military administration and promoting the establishment of a more effective republican army.

=== Conscription and military education ===
One of Trivulzio's principal concerns was the implementation of compulsory military service. The development of a national conscription system was viewed by leading members of the republican government as a means of strengthening the state and reducing its military dependence on France. The application of compulsory service nevertheless encountered difficulties, including public resistance to recruitment and limited administrative resources. Trivulzio also supported the reorganisation of the military school at Modena and the Military College for Orphans in Milan. The latter institution had been established in 1801 to provide education for children of military families. During Trivulzio's administration, the college acquired a more formal organisational structure, with a director, revised admission requirements and an expanded curriculum. Its educational programme was intended to prepare pupils either for service as non-commissioned officers or for further study at military academies. The development of these institutions formed part of the broader effort to professionalise the military establishment of the Italian Republic.

=== Political conflicts ===
Trivulzio's tenure was marked by disputes involving senior military officers and competing factions within the republican government. These conflicts were connected to broader tensions between the Italian administration and French military authorities, particularly over appointments, command structures and the control of military resources. During the political controversy known as the Affaire Ceroni, Trivulzio became involved in the conflict between rival military groups. Acting under orders from Melzi, he was required to authorise the arrest of his former colleague Pietro Teulié. Melzi subsequently attempted to reduce Trivulzio's influence by proposing changes in the ministry's administration and considering alternative candidates for his position. Although Bonaparte initially rejected some of these proposals, the minister's position remained politically vulnerable.

=== Dispute with Domenico Pino ===
In 1804 Trivulzio became involved in an increasingly serious dispute with General Domenico Pino, commander of the Italian division stationed in France. The disagreement arose partly from Pino's decisions concerning the organisation of troops under his command, which Trivulzio considered to have been taken without proper ministerial authority. Pino challenged the minister's right to intervene, asserting that his command was subject directly to Napoleon. Contemporary correspondence reveals the severity of the dispute and its political consequences.

The controversy ultimately contributed to Napoleon's decision to exchange the responsibilities of the two generals. By a decree of 13 August 1804, Trivulzio was appointed commander of the Italian division serving with the French Army of the Coasts of the Ocean. Pino was appointed Minister of War from 1 September 1804.

The decision was also connected with the growing involvement of Napoleon in the internal affairs of the Italian Republic and the limited autonomy of its government.

== Final military command ==
In September 1804 Trivulzio travelled to France to take command of the Italian division assigned to Napoleon's projected invasion of Britain. The troops were stationed in northern France as part of the forces assembled along the Channel coast. By this time his health had deteriorated considerably. In correspondence with French and Italian officials, Melzi reported that Trivulzio had suffered a serious fall from a horse, which had damaged his eyesight. He also described recurring episodes of illness and fever. These medical problems made it increasingly difficult for Trivulzio to perform his duties as divisional commander. Official correspondence preserved in the Archivio di Stato di Milano confirms that he remained engaged in military matters from Paris in December 1804, including recommendations concerning officers and communications with the Ministry of War. On 16 February 1805 Pietro Teulié informed the Italian authorities that he had assumed temporary command of the division because of Trivulzio's serious illness.

== Death and funeral ==
Alessandro Trivulzio died in Paris on 2 March 1805, shortly before his thirty-second birthday. The date is given in Giacomo Girardi's modern archival study and in Raffaello Barbiera's historical biography of Cristina Trivulzio di Belgiojoso. (Note: The Italian and French Wikipedia biographies give 5 March 1805. Girardi (2025, p. 103) and Barbiera (1922) give 2 March 1805.) Napoleon ordered a solemn military funeral, which took place on 7 March 1805 at the Church of the Madeleine in Paris. The ceremony was attended by senior French and Italian officers and a large military contingent. Cardinal Giovanni Battista Caprara, Archbishop of Milan, officiated at the service. A further commemoration was held at the cathedral of Calais on 9 March 1805, organised by the Italian troops who had served under his command. The Italian poet Ugo Foscolo, who had served under Trivulzio during the defence of Genoa, composed a Latin epitaph commemorating the general. The inscription was displayed during the military funeral ceremonies and subsequently appeared in the Giornale Italiano on 29 April 1805 and the Corriere milanese on 5 May 1805.

== Personal life ==
=== Relations with his family ===
Trivulzio's commitment to republicanism produced lasting tensions with his aristocratic family. Correspondence with his father reveals his attempts to reconcile filial loyalty with his political convictions and military career. The family's decision to distance itself from the revolutionary administration contrasted with Alessandro's active participation in the republican military establishment. His decision to pursue military service also caused financial difficulties. Contemporary letters refer to the expenses associated with military life, including the maintenance of horses, servants and residences, and his repeated requests for financial assistance from his father. Alessandro also disagreed with his younger brother Gian Giacomo over political and family matters. He criticised Gian Giacomo's marriage to Beatrice Serbelloni in April 1798, regarding the alliance with a family closely associated with the previous Austrian administration as incompatible with republican ideals.

=== Inheritance ===
Following the death of Giorgio Teodoro Trivulzio on 7 July 1802, the family's traditional titles, including that of Marquis of Sesto Ulteriano, passed to Alessandro's younger brother Gian Giacomo. The succession has been attributed to Alessandro's political commitments and his decision to pursue a career independent of the family's traditional aristocratic expectations. Melzi later reported that Alessandro had lost approximately two-thirds of his expected patrimony as a consequence of his family's opposition to the Revolution.

=== Relationships ===
Some older genealogical accounts state that Trivulzio married Giovanna Mejer, also recorded as Giovanna Majer, in 1799 and was widowed the following year. This marriage has not been independently verified in recent archival scholarship.

His relationship with Giuseppina Rosa Pellacini Cassini is better documented. She appears in contemporary correspondence and in Trivulzio's testament, which provided her with an annual income of 15,000 francs and the furnishings of his residence in Via Borgonuovo, Milan. That residence is now known as Palazzo Moriggia, the home of Milan's Museum of the Risorgimento.

== Portraits ==
Trivulzio was portrayed by several artists during his military career. An engraved portrait by Francesco Rosaspina, dating from approximately 1800, depicts him in the uniform of a brigadier general. Another engraved portrait was produced by Benedetto and Gaudenzio Bordiga from a drawing by Giuseppe Longhi during his service as Minister of War.

A portrait painted by Andrea Appiani around 1803–1804 depicts Trivulzio in the uniform of a senior general and Minister of War. The painting, an oil on canvas measuring 98 by 73 centimetres, belongs to the Fondazione Trivulzio in Milan and has been included in exhibitions devoted to Appiani and the Napoleonic period.

== Historical assessment ==
Nineteenth-century accounts often presented Trivulzio as an officer whose rise had been assisted more by his aristocratic background than by exceptional military ability. Giacomo Lombroso, writing in 1843, questioned whether his advancement could be justified by his professional achievements. His reputation was subsequently overshadowed by those of better-known Napoleonic generals and prominent members of his family, particularly his younger brother Gian Giacomo and his niece Cristina Trivulzio di Belgiojoso.

Modern research has offered a different interpretation. In a 2025 scholarly study based on previously unpublished family correspondence and military records, historian Giacomo Girardi argued that Trivulzio's life illustrates the complex response of the Lombard nobility to the political transformations of the revolutionary period. Girardi emphasised Trivulzio's republican convictions, sense of public duty and attempts to reconcile inherited aristocratic values with service to a new political order. Rather than treating his military career simply as opportunistic accommodation to Napoleon's regime, this interpretation presents Trivulzio as an example of the changing relationship between nobility, military service and political identity in Napoleonic Italy.

== Bibliography ==
- Barbiera, Raffaello (1922). La principessa Belgiojoso (in Italian). Milan: Fratelli Treves.
- Della Peruta, Franco (1996). Esercito e società nell'Italia napoleonica: Dalla Cisalpina al Regno d'Italia (in Italian) (3rd ed.). Milan: FrancoAngeli.
- Girardi, Giacomo (2025). "Un nobile «troppo repubblicano»: Alessandro Trivulzio fra tradizione famigliare e servizio pubblico (1796–1805)". In Dal Cin, Valentina (ed.). Dietro le quinte dell'Impero: Biografie e prosopografie nell'Europa napoleonica (in Italian). Venice: Edizioni Ca' Foscari. pp. 85–110. doi:10.30687/978-88-6969-941-2/004. ISBN 978-88-6969-941-2.
- Girardi, Giacomo (2025). "Le scuole militari napoleoniche: sapere tecnico e coscienza patriottica". In Bonvini, Andrea (ed.). Il sapere delle armi: Formazione, istruzione e pratiche nelle scuole militari del Risorgimento (in Italian). Rome: Viella. pp. 123–144. ISBN 979-12-5469-946-1.
- Levati, Stefano (2005). "Politica, affarismo ed esercito: la lotta per il potere nel Ministero della guerra durante la Seconda Repubblica cisalpina e la Repubblica italiana (giugno 1800–maggio 1805)". L'affaire Ceroni: Ordine militare e cospirazione politica nella Milano di Bonaparte (in Italian). Milan: Guerini e Associati. pp. 65–96. ISBN 8883356659.
- Levati, Stefano (2001). "La riorganizzazione amministrativa dell'esercito della Repubblica italiana: le riforme di Melzi e l'operato del Consiglio d'amministrazione della guerra (1802–1805)". Società e Storia (in Italian) (93). FrancoAngeli: 463–513.
- Lombroso, Giacomo (1843). Vite dei primarj generali ed ufficiali italiani che si distinsero nelle guerre napoleoniche dal 1796 al 1815 (in Italian). Milan: Borroni e Scotti.
- Melosi, Laura (2011). A perenne memoria: L'epigrafia italiana nell'Ottocento (PDF) (in Italian). Rome: Edizioni di Storia e Letteratura. ISBN 978-88-6372-375-5.
- Pedretti, Paolo (2020). "Trivulzio, Gian Giacomo". Dizionario Biografico degli Italiani (in Italian). Vol. 97. Istituto della Enciclopedia Italiana.
- Zaghi, Carlo, ed. (1958). I carteggi di Francesco Melzi d'Eril, duca di Lodi: La vicepresidenza della Repubblica italiana (in Italian). Vol. 1. Milan: Museo del Risorgimento e Raccolte storiche del Comune.
