= Karl Wilhelm Ernst von Waldenfels =

Prussian officer (b. 1772, d. 1807)

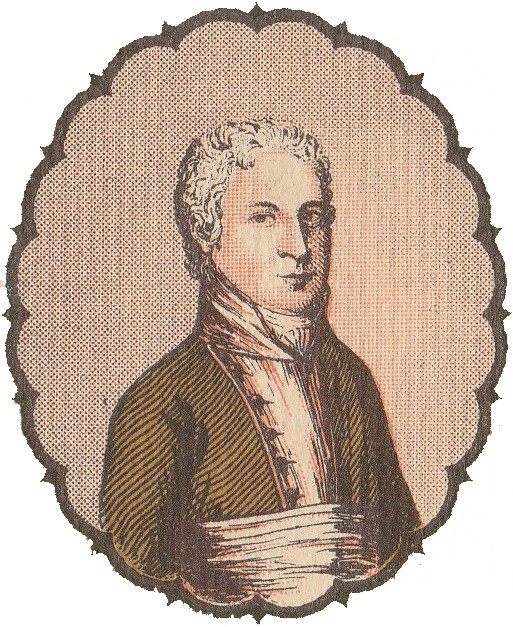
- Portrait on a German notgeld 50 pfennig banknote issued at Kolberg in 1921
- Born: 10 April 1772; Bayreuth, Bayreuth
- Died: 15 June 1807 (aged 35); Kolberg, Pomerania
- Military career
- Allegiance: Kingdom of Prussia
- Branch: Prussian Army
- Service years: 1792–1807
- Rank: Major
- Conflicts: War of the Fourth Coalition; Siege of Kolberg †
- Awards: Pour le Mérite

Major Karl Wilhelm Ernst von Waldenfels (10 April 1772, Baireuth – 15 June 1807, Kolberg) was a Royal Prussian Army officer who served as Vice Commander of Kolberg during the French siege of Kolberg and fell in its defence.

== Sources ==
- Poten, Bernhard von (1896). "Waldenfels, Karl Wilhelm Ernst von". In Liliencron, Rochus von (ed.). Allgemeine Deutsche Biographie. Vol. 40. Leipzig: Duncker & Humblot. pp. 691–2.
