= Pietro Teulié =

Italian general (1769–1807)

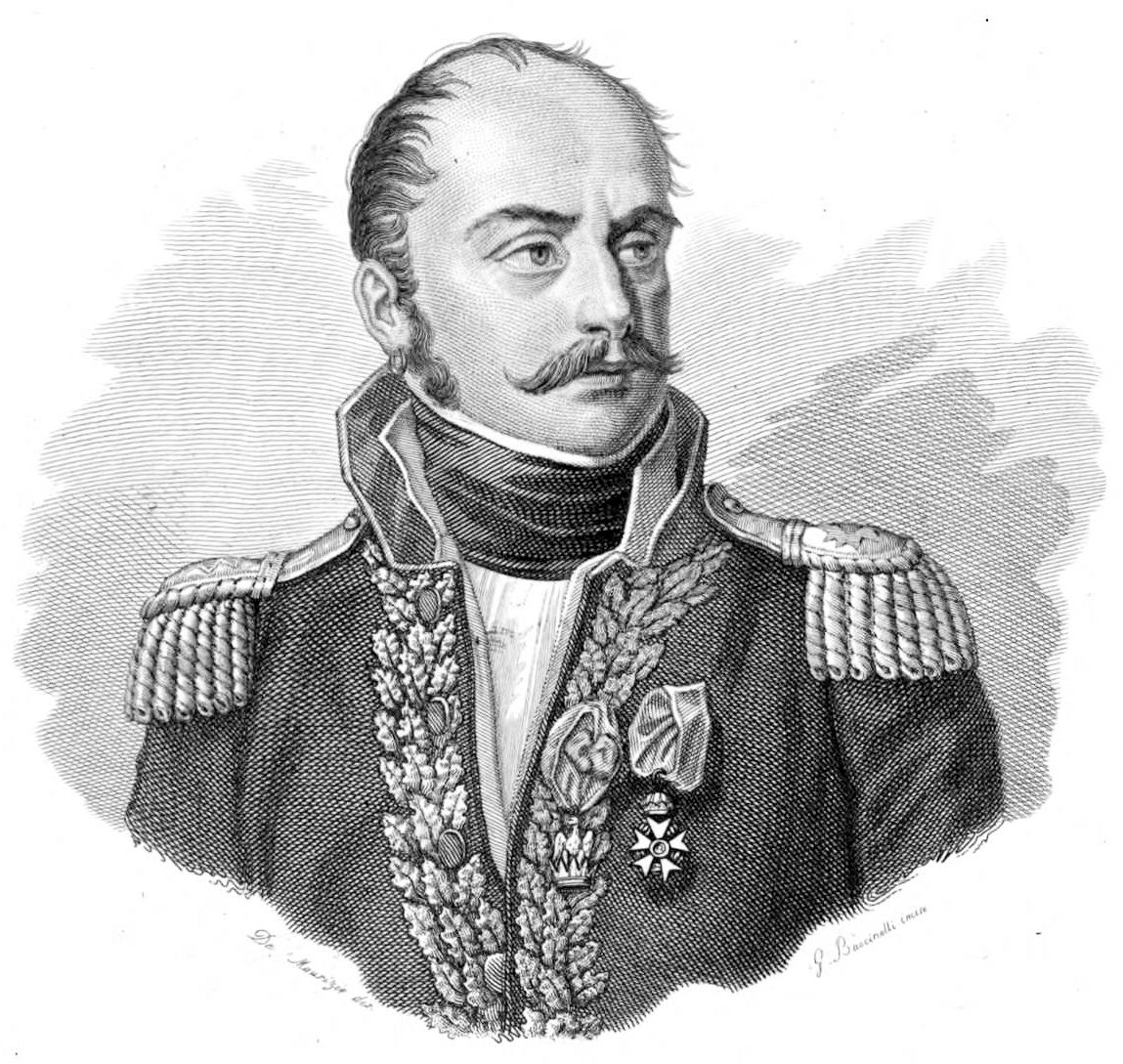
- Born: 3 February 1769; Milan, Duchy of Milan
- Died: 18 June 1807 (aged 38); Kolberg, Kingdom of Prussia
- Military career
- Allegiance: Kingdom of Italy
- Service years: 1796–1807
- Rank: Division general
- Conflicts: French Revolutionary Wars; Italian campaigns; War of the First Coalition; Battle of Faenza; War of the Second Coalition; Battle of Marengo; Napoleonic Wars; War of the Fourth Coalition; Siege of Kolberg †
- Awards: Legion of Honour; Order of the Iron Crown

Pietro Teulié (3 February 1769 – 18 June 1807) was an Italian general who served in the Kingdom of Italy during the Napoleonic Wars. He was killed during the siege of the Prussian fortress of Kolberg.

== Early life ==
He was born in Milan, the son of Filippo Teulié and Teresa Crippa. His father, a state officer, was the last descendant of a medium-class family from Languedoc, and tried to make him a lawyer, with scarce results.

== Career ==
=== Early service ===
In 1796, when the French with Napoleon Bonaparte entered Milan, he joined the National Guard of the Cisalpine Republic, as the second-in-command of Duke Gian Galeazzo Serbelloni.

On 15 October he was moved to the Lombard Legion as head of battalion and aide-de-camp to the Mantuan general Giuseppe Lahoz Ortiz, and in this capacity served during the French invasion of the Papal States. At the Battle of Faenza General Lahoz was wounded and he took command of the entire Legion, defeating the far more numerous Pontificians and capturing over one thousand prisoners, four banners and fourteen guns. He then conquered the fort of San Leo.

In February 1799 he commanded the territorial division of Ferrara, and later served under General Garnier as his chief of staff, during the disastrous campaign against the Austro-Russian forces. Besieged with a handful of men in Castel Sant'Angelo, he surrendered only on the guarantee of military honours and a safeconduct, taking a ship that brought him in France.

He then started to reorganise the troops of the collapsed Cisalpine Republic in the new Italian Legion, commanded by general Giuseppe Lechi, in which many officers and petty officers, due to the lack of recruits, served as simple soldiers. He distinguished himself during the Battle of Marengo, and was promoted to the rank of brigadier general.

In December 1800 the nicknamed "Teulié Brigade" was attached to the division of General Brune, who was ordered to attack in the Tirol to cut the Austrian communication lines. The short campaign was a complete success, and Brune later write on him: "We due every praise to the unshackable courage and capable direction of General Teulié".

=== The Italian Kingdom ===
He was nominated Minister of War of the Kingdom of Italy in April 1802, but left the position shortly after, possibly for his contrast with the Frenchmen that opposed his project of an independent Italian Army in an independent Italian state. In 1803 his brigade was part of the 2nd Italian Division of general Domenico Pino on The Channel, and, the following year, received the cross of the Legion d'Honneur by the Emperor himself.

After a false accuse, he was subsequently removed and imprisoned, but Napoleon eventually restored him in his position and honours, giving him the rank of division general and the command of the Pino's Division. He was awarded, in 1806, with the just instituted Order of the Iron Crown.

=== The War of the Fourth Coalition ===
After a brief service in the quarters of Boulogne, he distinguished himself leading his division in the War of the Fourth Coalition. He won against the Prussians Stargard and Neugarten, and was afterward placed as military governor of Prussia. The 24 February 1807 passed the Persante river and moved with a forced march on Kolberg. His commander, Marshal Berthier wrote of him: "Teulié with his men goes on a double pace; he has completely beaten the defenders of Kolberg and locked them into the fortress."

=== Death at Kolberg ===
The 14 March 1807 he started the siege of Kolberg, under general Loison, who let him command all the siege operations. On the 12 June 1807, during a first line combat, a grenade killed two of his men and struck him in his leg. He died six days after from tetanus.

== Legacy ==
His name was inscribed on the 17th column of the Arc de Triomphe in Paris, one of the few Italian generals to have his name inscribed. According to his last will, his body was then buried in the Military Orphanage for Our Fallen's Children, in Milan, now the Italian Military School "Teulié", named after him.

== Awards ==
- Officer of the Legion d'Honneur
- Commander of the Order of the Iron Crown
