= Siege of Kolberg (1807) =

1807 Siege during the War of the Fourth Coalition

- Part of the War of the Fourth Coalition and the Franco-Swedish War
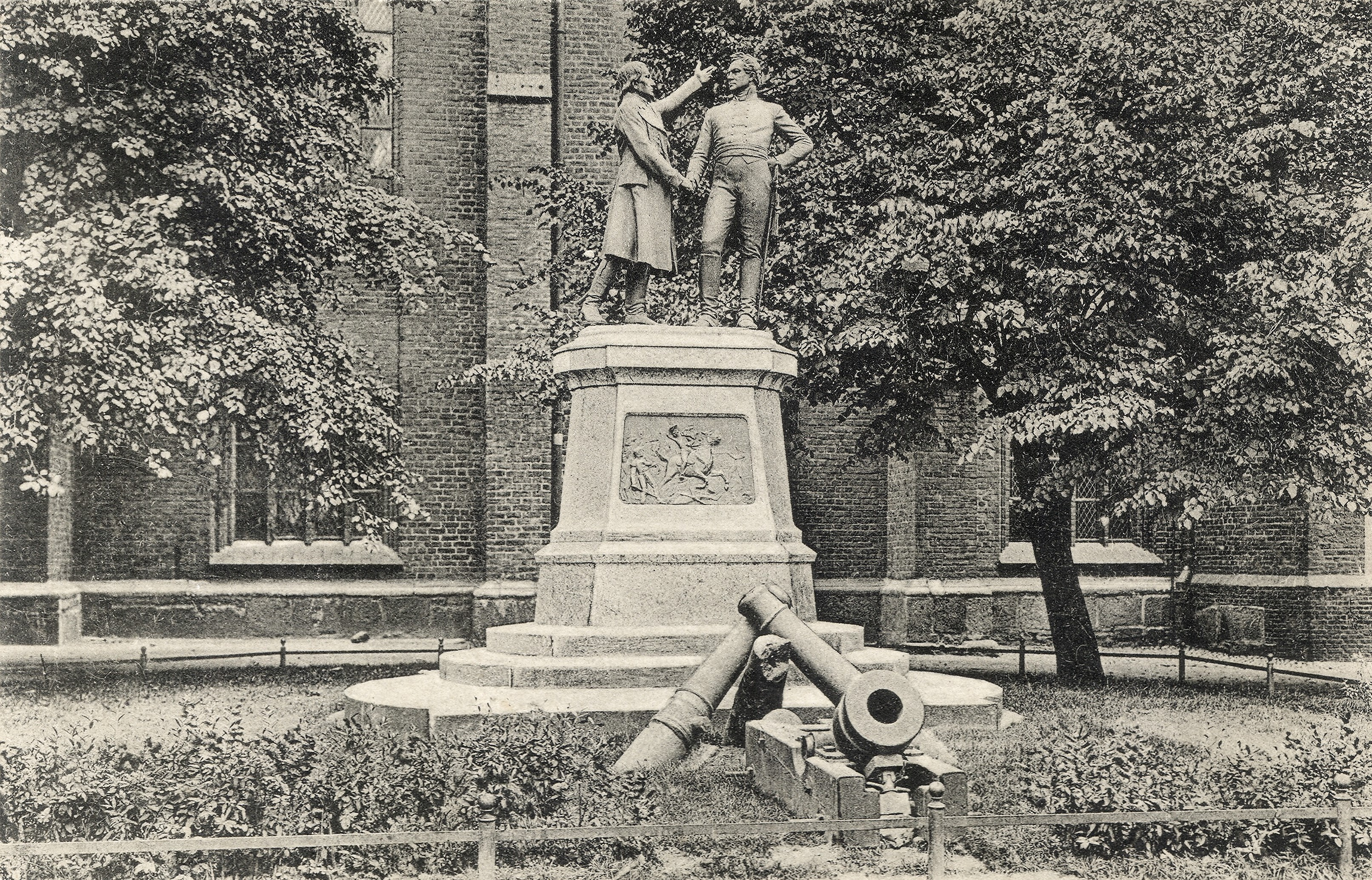
- Former battle memorial with statues of Joachim Nettelbeck and Gneisenau in Kolberg
Date	20 March – 2 July 1807
Location	Kolberg (Kołobrzeg), Prussian Province of Pomerania 54°10′39″N 15°34′36″E
Result	Siege lifted by peace treaty

Belligerents
(First French Empire) French Empire: Polish insurgents; Italy; (Netherlands) Kingdom of Holland; Saxe-Coburg-Saalfeld; Saxe-Gotha-Altenburg; Saxe-Meiningen; Saxe-Hildburghausen; Saxe-Weimar; Württemberg; Nassau	(Kingdom of Prussia) Prussia; Naval support: (United Kingdom of Great Britain and Ireland) United Kingdom; Sweden

Commanders and leaders
(First French Empire) Claude Victor-Perrin (First French Empire) Édouard Mortier (First French Empire) Louis Henri Loison (Kingdom of Italy (Napoleonic)) Pietro Teulié † (Kingdom of Italy (Napoleonic)) Filippo Severoli	(Kingdom of Prussia) August von Gneisenau (Kingdom of Prussia) L. M. von Lucadou (Kingdom of Prussia) Joachim Nettelbeck (Kingdom of Prussia) Ferdinand von Schill

Strength
14,000; 41 guns	6,000; 230 guns 46 guns on Swedish frigate

Casualties and losses
5,000 killed, wounded or captured	3,000 killed, wounded or captured

War of the Fourth Coalition
⬤ current battle
⬤ Napoleon not in command
⬤ Napoleon in command

The siege of Kolberg (also spelled Colberg or Kołobrzeg) took place from March to 2 July 1807 during the War of the Fourth Coalition, part of the Napoleonic Wars. An army of the First French Empire and several foreign troops (including Polish insurgents) of France besieged the fortified town of Kolberg, the only remaining Prussian-held fortress in the Province of Pomerania. The siege was unsuccessful and was lifted upon the announcement of the Peace of Tilsit.

After Prussia lost the Battle of Jena–Auerstedt in late 1806, French troops marched north into Prussian Pomerania. Fortified Stettin (Szczecin) surrendered without battle, and the province became occupied by the French forces. Kolberg resisted, and the implementation of a French siege was delayed until March 1807 by the freikorps of Ferdinand von Schill operating around the fortress and capturing the assigned French commander of the siege, Victor-Perrin. During these months, the military commander of Kolberg, Lucadou, and the representative of the local populace, Nettelbeck, prepared the fortress's defensive structures.

The French forces commanded by Teulié, mainly troops from Italy, succeeded in encircling Kolberg by mid-March. Napoleon put the siege force under the command of Loison; Frederick William III entrusted Gneisenau with the defense. In early April, the siege forces were for a short time commanded by Mortier, who had marched a large force from besieged Swedish Stralsund to Kolberg but was ordered to return when Stralsund's defenders gained ground. Other reinforcements came from states of the Confederation of the Rhine (Kingdom of Württemberg, Saxon duchies and the Duchy of Nassau), the Kingdom of Holland, and France.

With the western surroundings of Kolberg had thousands of French soldiers attacking the defenders, fighting concentrated on the eastern forefield of the fortress, where Wolfsberg sconce had been constructed on Lucadou's behalf. Aiding the defense from the nearby Baltic Sea were a British and a Swedish vessel. By late June, Napoleon massively reinforced the siege forces to bring about a decision. The siege force then also concentrated on taking the port north of the town. On 2 July, fighting ceased when Prussia had agreed on an unfavourable peace after her ally Russia suffered a decisive defeat at Friedland. Of the twenty Prussian fortresses, Kolberg was one of the few remaining in Prussian hands until the war's end. The battle became a myth in Prussia and was later used by Nazi propaganda efforts. While prior to World War II the city commemorated the defendants, it started to honor the commander of the Polish troops after 1945, when the city became part of a Polish state.

== Prelude ==
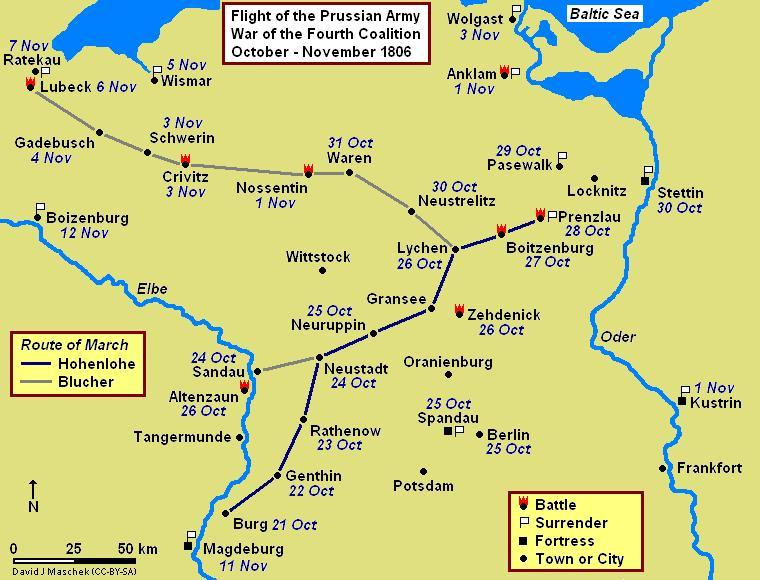
Prussian retreat, 1806

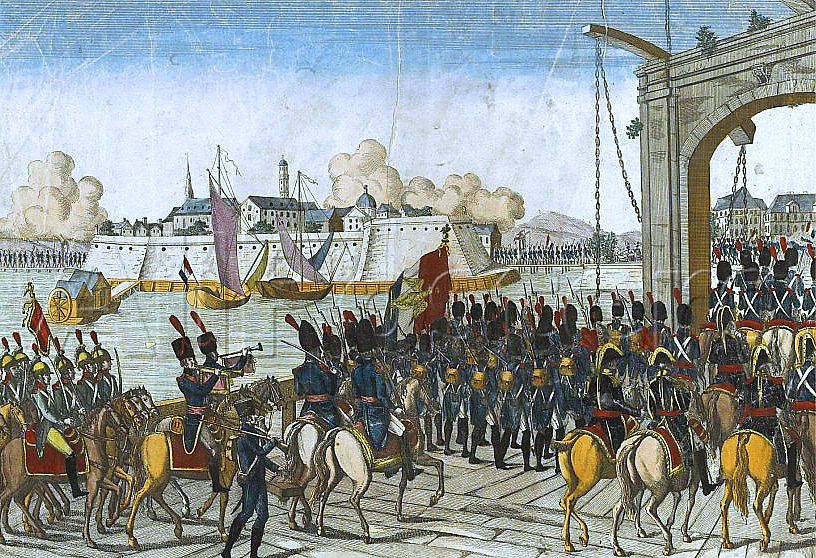
Capitulation of Stettin

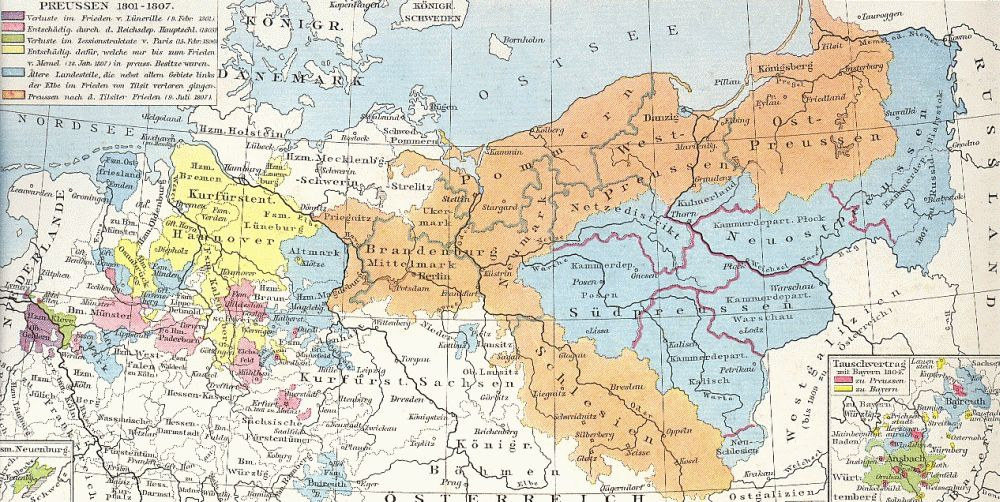
Kingdom of Prussia, 1806

Within two weeks after the Battle of Jena-Auerstedt (14 October 1806), Napoleon's Grande Armée had pursued the defeated Royal Prussian Army to Pasewalk in Prussian Pomerania. The provincial capital Stettin (now Szczecin), one of twenty Prussian fortresses, capitulated on 29 October the province's only fortress remaining in Prussian hands. Pierre Thouvenout was appointed French governor of Pomerania and sent his envoy Mestram to accept Kolberg's expected capitulation and take control of it.

On 8 November 1806, Mestram met with the Prussian commander of Kolberg Louis Maurice de Lucadou (Ludwig Moritz von Lucadou) before its walls. Lucadou's refusal to hand over the fortress came as a surprise to the French generals and the Prussian administration in Stettin, who had already pledged allegiance to the French; it further led part of the defeated Prussian army to take refuge in Kolberg and reinforce the two musketeer battalions of the von Owstien and von Borcke regiments and the 72 guns garrisoned there. Lucadou ordered the Persante (Parseta) river west of Kolberg to be dammed up to flood the area around the fortress, and arranged the construction of Wolfsberg sconce east of the town. Coordination of these measures with Joachim Nettelbeck, representative of the Kolberg citizens, was however impaired by the latter's personal grievances against Lucadou.

Among the Prussian soldiers who had retreated to Kolberg after Jena and Auerstedt was secondelieutenant Ferdinand von Schill, who after his recovery from a severe head injury in the house of Kolberg senator Westphal was ordered to patrol the areas west of the fortress with a small cavalry unit. Supplied with information about French movements by local peasants, he succeeded in capturing a number of French officers and soldiers, gathering food and financial supplies in neighboring towns and villages, and recruiting volunteers to his unit from inside and outside Kolberg.

Schill's victory in the skirmish of Gülzow (7 December 1806), though insignificant from a military point of view, was widely noted as the first Prussian success against the French army - while Prussian king Frederick William III praised Schill as the "kind of man now valued by the fatherland", Napoleon referred to him as a "miserable kind of brigand". "ce miserable, qui est une espèce de brigand" As a consequence of these successes and Schill's increasing fame, Prussian king Frederick William III ordered him to establish a freikorps on 12 January 1807, which in the following months defended the fortress against French attacks allowing its defenders to complete their preparations for the expected siege with Swedish and British support via the Baltic.

Time for preparation was needed since Kolberg lacked sufficient defensive structures, manpower and armament to withstand a siege. The defensive works of the fortress had been neglected, only the port and Kirchhof sconce had been prepared for defense when Prussia feared war with Russia and Sweden in 1805 and 1806, but they had been disarmed in September. By early December 1806, the Kolberg garrison numbered 1,576 men, but increased steadily during the next months due to the arrival of Prussian troops and new recruits from nearby areas. Armament shortages were in part relieved by Charles XIII of Sweden, who sent rifle components from which local gunsmiths made 2,000 new rifles. As of late October 1806, a total of 72 guns were mounted on Kolberg's walls: 58 metal/iron cannons (8x 24 lb, 4x 20 lb, 40x 12 lb, 6x 6 lb), six iron howitzers (10 lb) and eight iron mortars (5x 50 lb, 3x 25 lb); in addition, there were four mobile 3-pounder cannons. While a convoy with artillery reinforcements was held up and captured by French forces near Stettin, twelve 12-pounder cannons reached Kolberg from the Prussian fortress of Danzig and the Swedish fortress of Stralsund, who each sent six guns. Since no further artillery reinforcements came in, the Kolberg garrison mounted an additional 92 guns on the walls which previously had been deemed unusable and withdrawn from service; these guns were positioned at the flanks at it was speculated that they might still serve to fire rocks and canister shots at short distances. Six guns captured by Schill's freikorps were also sent to Kolberg.

Claude Victor-Perrin, whom Napoleon Bonaparte had entrusted with taking Kolberg, was captured by Schill's forces in Arnswalde (12 January), detained in Kolberg and later exchanged against Prussian general Gebhard Leberecht von Blücher. With Victor-Perrin captured, the attack on Kolberg was to be led by Pietro (Pierre) Teulié's Italian division, who in February began the march on the fortress from Stettin. Schill's freikorps further delayed the French advance by provoking several skirmishes and battles, the largest of which took place near Naugard (Nowogard). Teulié reached the Kolberg area by early March, and by the mid of the month (14 March) had cleared the surrounding villages of Schill's forces and encircled the fortress.

== Siege ==
=== Mid-March to April ===
Defenders
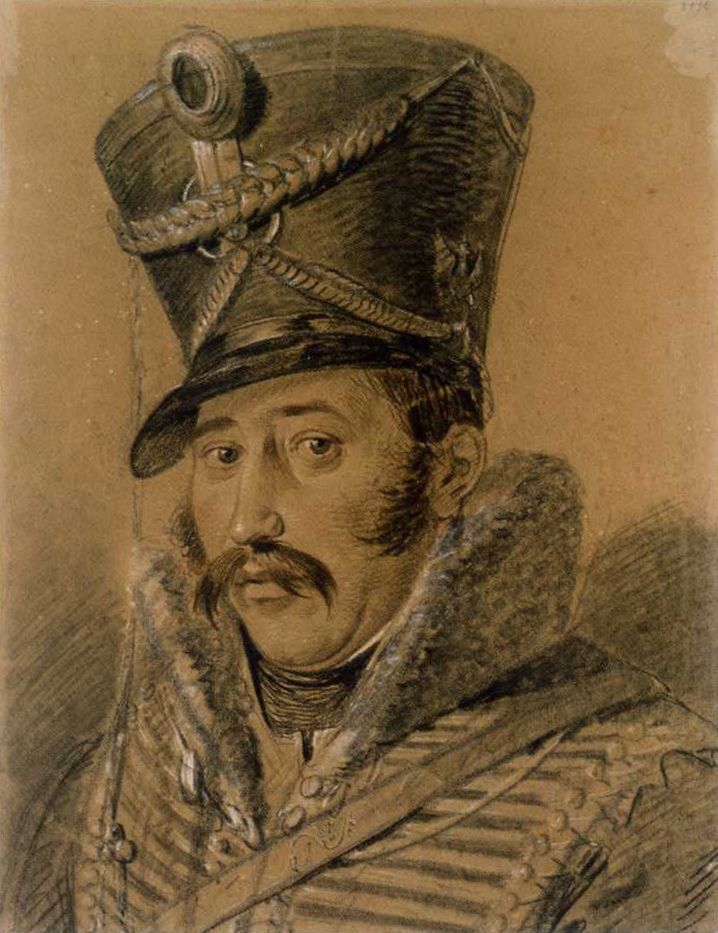
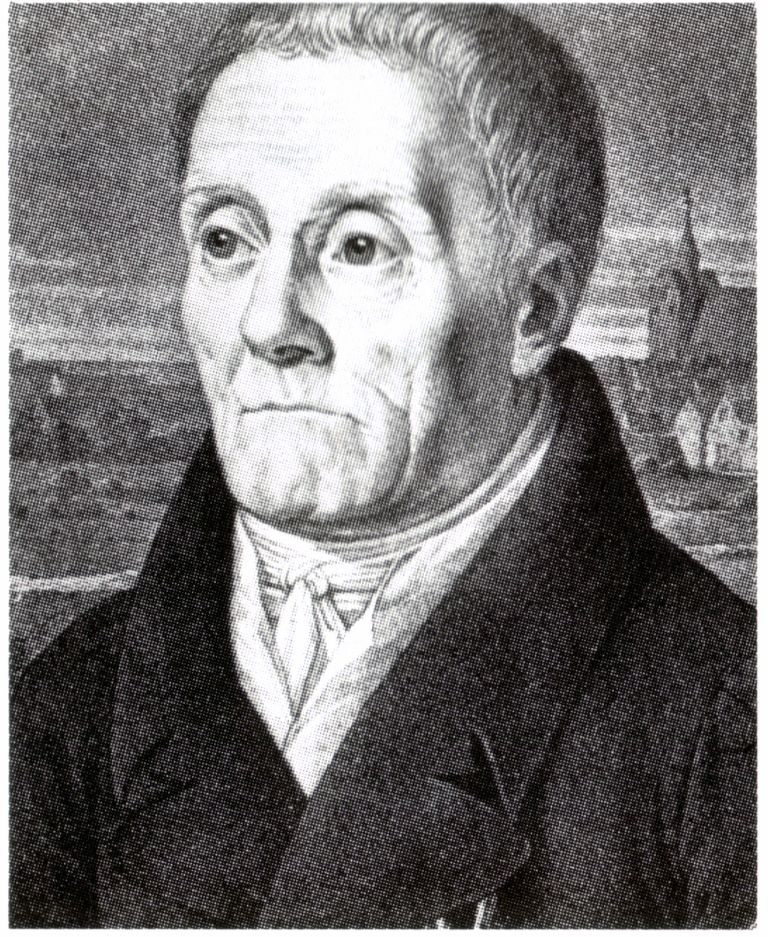
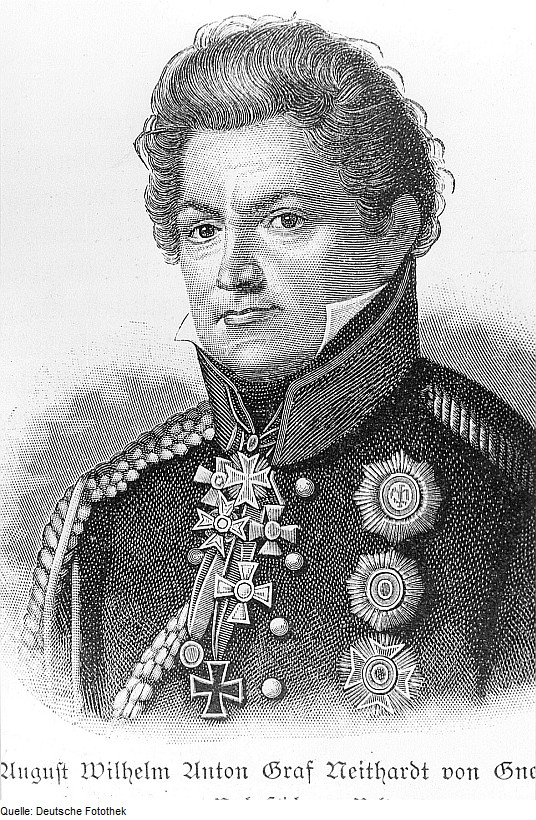
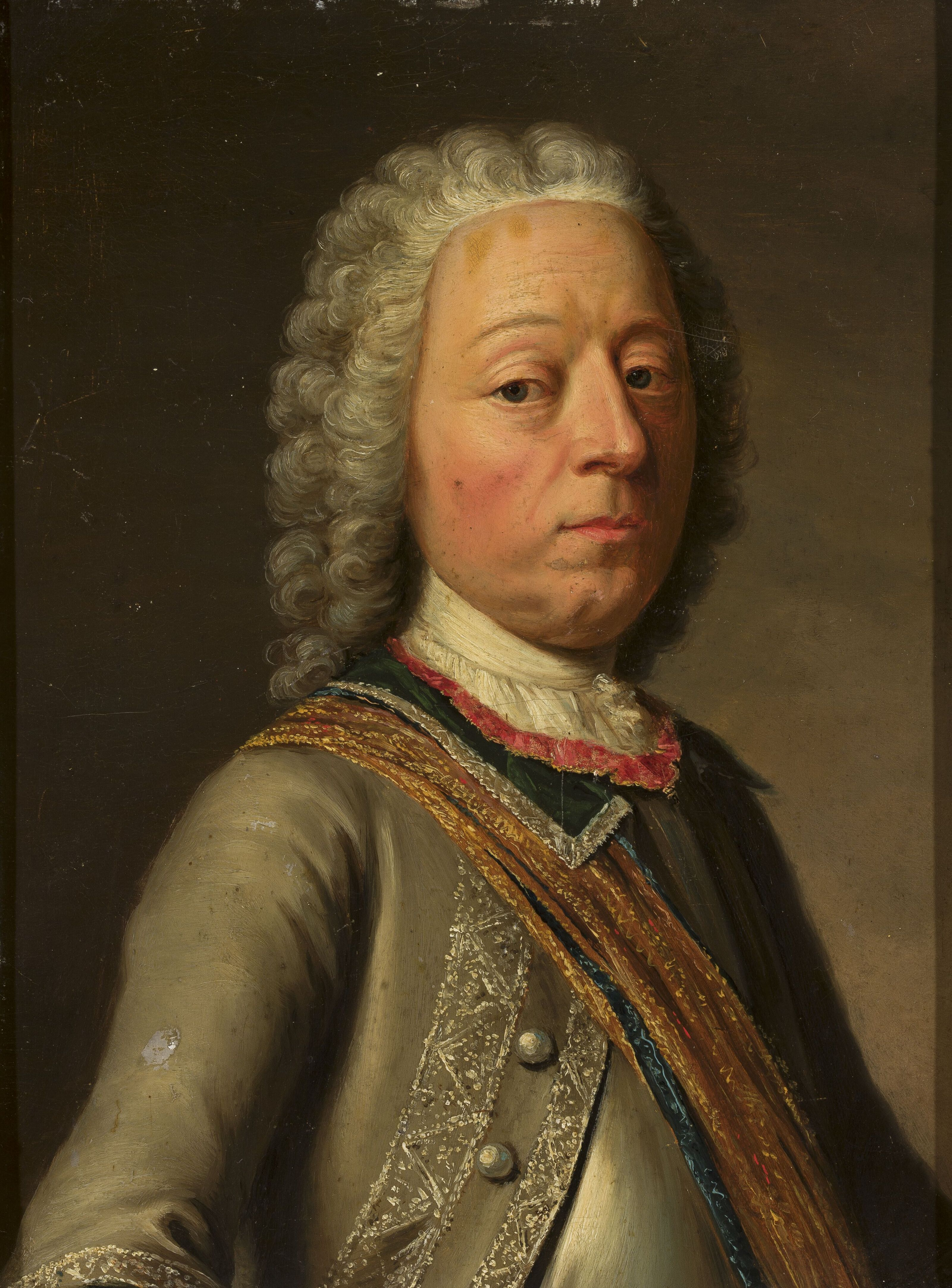
From left to right: Schill, Nettelbeck, Gneisenau and Lucadou.

When the French encirclement of Kolberg rendered Schill's strategy moot, Lucadou sent three cavalry units to aid the Krockow freikorps in the defense of Danzig, while Schill departed to aid in the defense of Stralsund in Swedish Pomerania. The suburbs, most notably Geldernerviertel, were burned down as it was customary.

Because of the delay in the French advance, Napoleon replaced Teulié as the commander of the siege forces with division general Louis Henri Loison; Frederick William III replaced Lucadou as the commander of the fortress with major August Neidhardt von Gneisenau after complaints by Nettelbeck and out of considerations for an envisioned British landfall at Kolberg - he feared that a French-born commander might irritate his British supporters, while on the other hand Gneisenau had been in British service during the American Revolutionary War.

In April, Napoleon withdrew the forces of Edouard Mortier from the siege of Stralsund and sent them to take Kolberg, however, Mortier soon had to return when the defenders of Stralsund pushed the remaining French troops out of Swedish Pomerania.

The French siege army was reinforced by troops from Württemberg and Saxon states (Saxe-Coburg-Saalfeld, Saxe-Gotha-Altenburg, Saxe-Meiningen, Saxe-Hildburghausen, and Saxe-Weimar,) as well as a Polish regiment. The Saxon and Württemberg regiments were part of the army of the Confederation of the Rhine, which - like the Kingdom of Italy, whose troops were already present at the siege – was a French client. The Polish regiment, led by Antoni Paweł Sułkowski, with a strength of 1,200 had been transferred from the siege of Danzig (Gdańsk) on 11 April and arrived on 20 April; it was the 1st infantry regiment of the Poznań legion raised by Jan Henryk Dąbrowski on Napoleon's behalf, after a Polish uprising against Prussian occupation and French liberation of Prussian controlled Poland had resulted in the creation of Duchy of Warsaw in part of partitioned Poland.

=== May to June ===
Siege force commanders
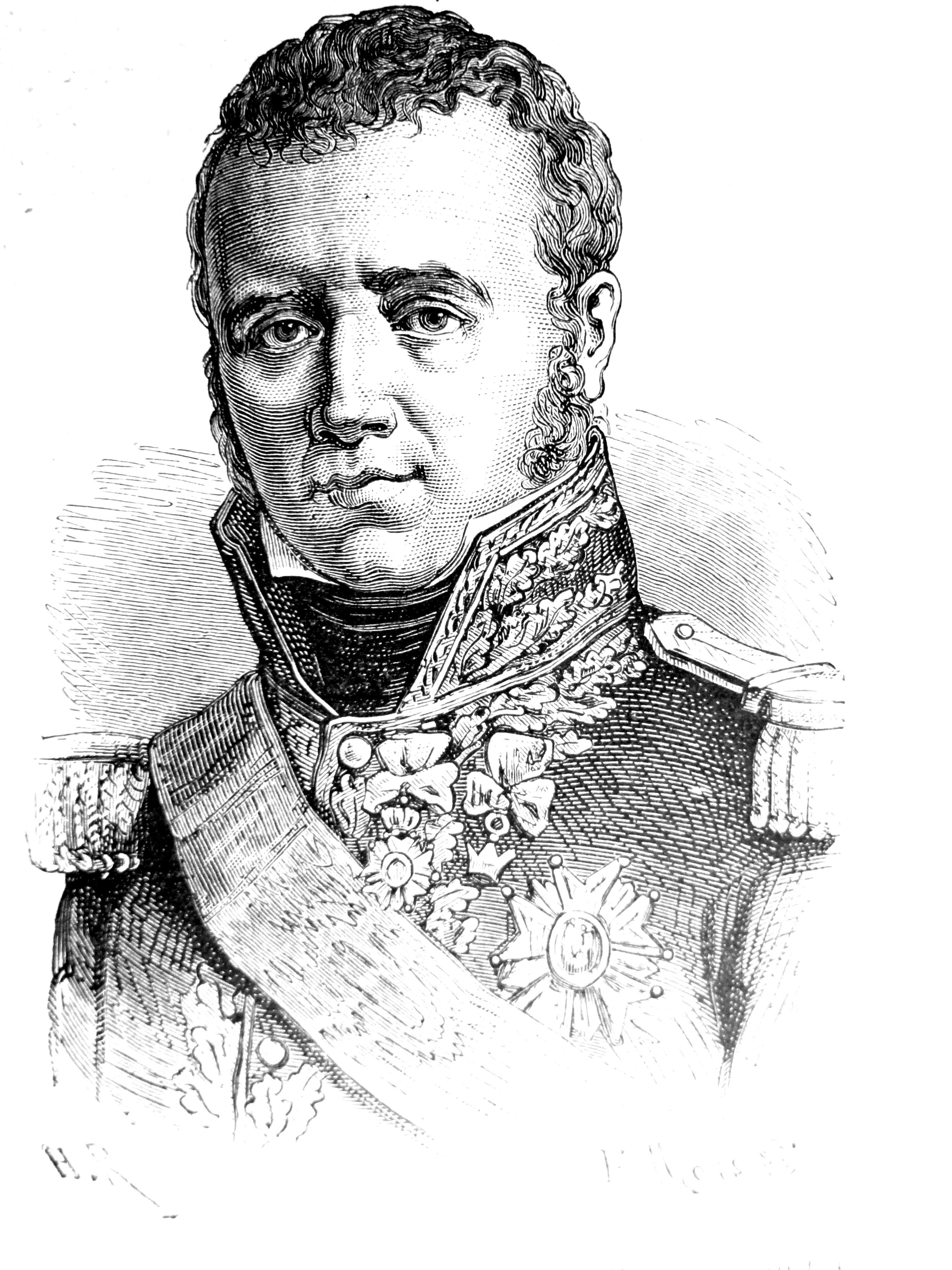
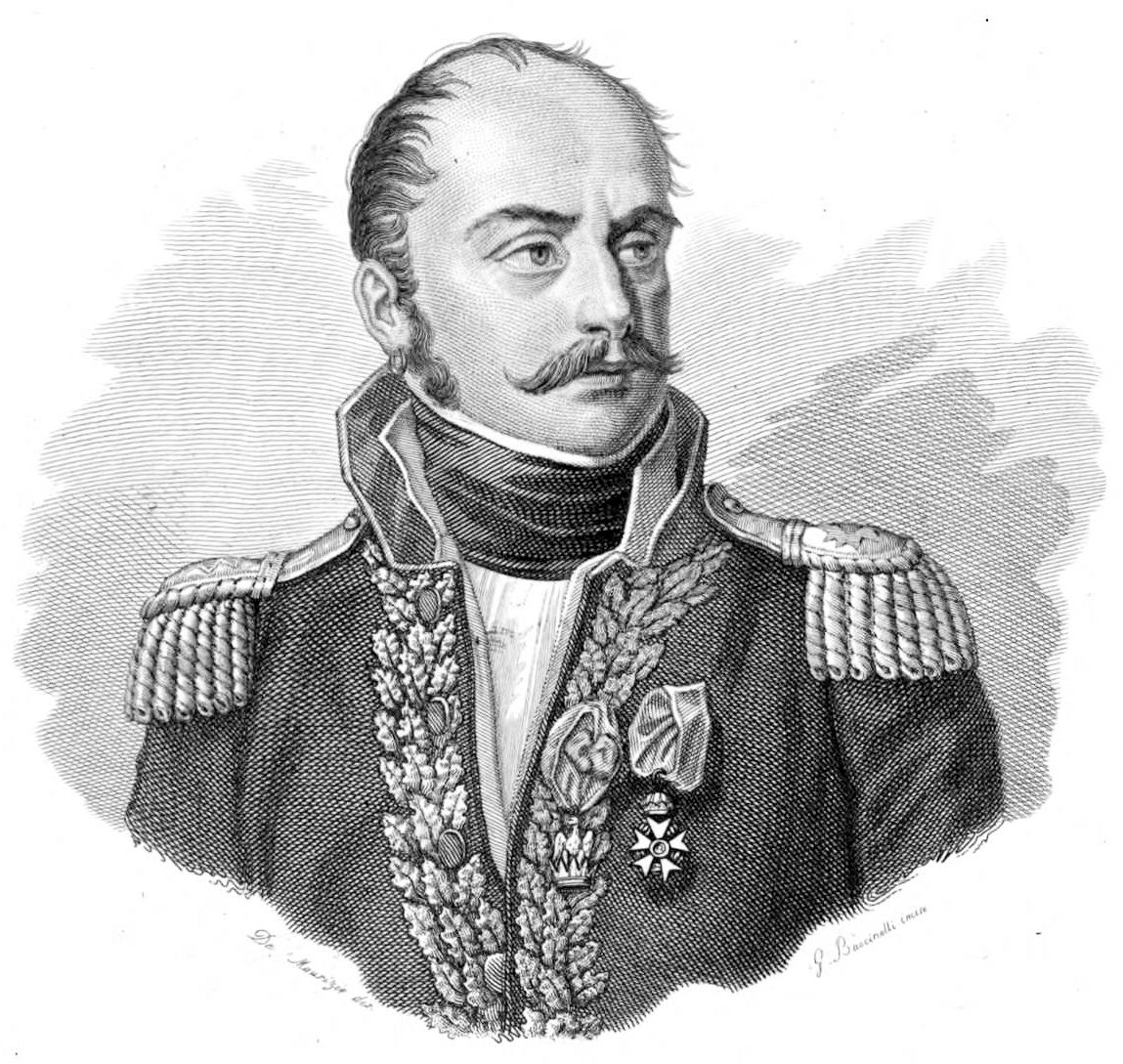
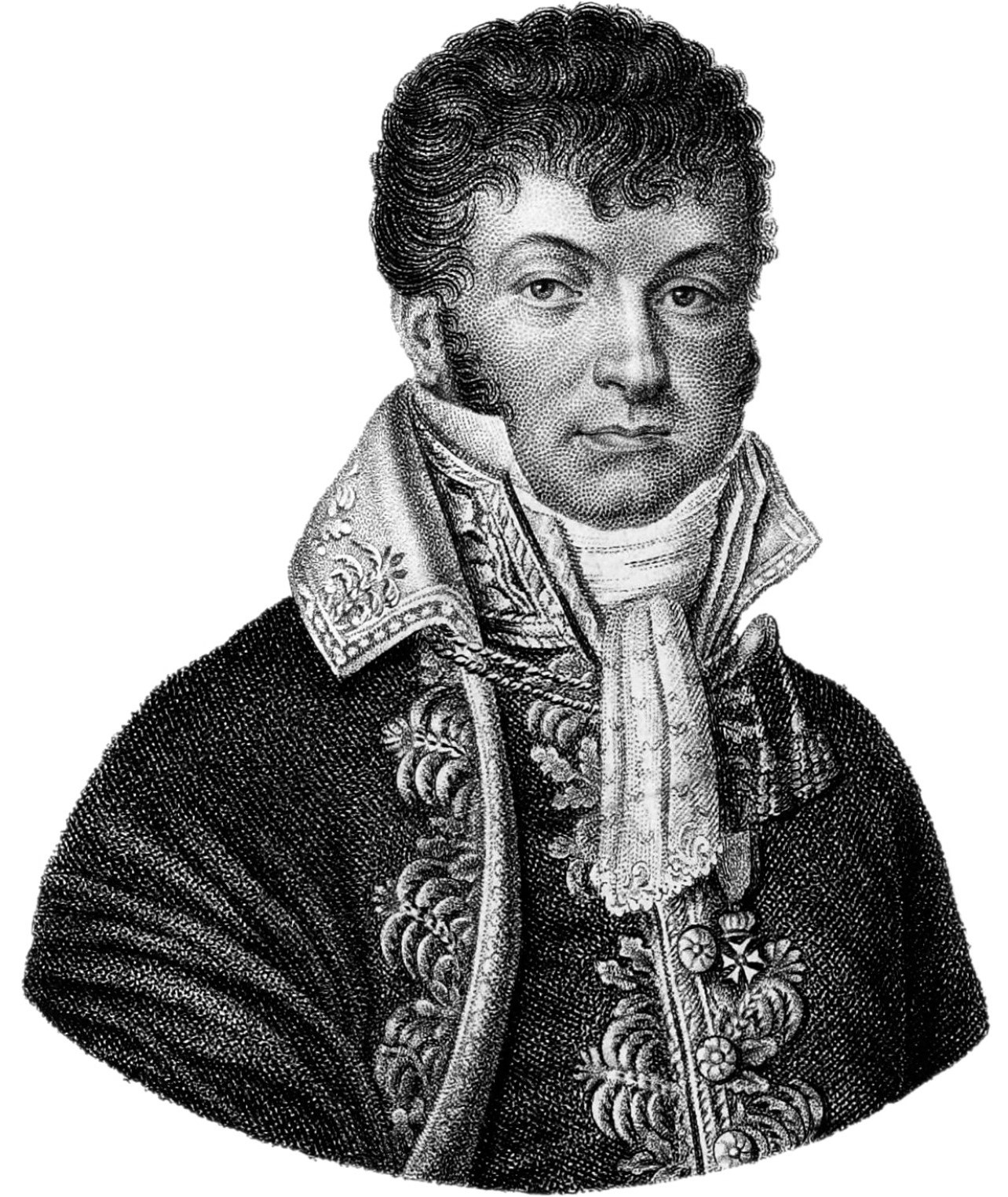
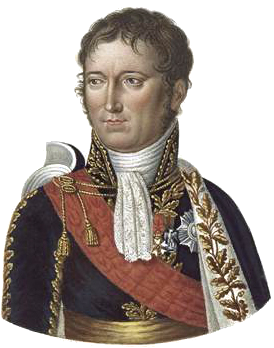
From left to right: Victor-Perrin, Teulié, Loison, and Mortier.

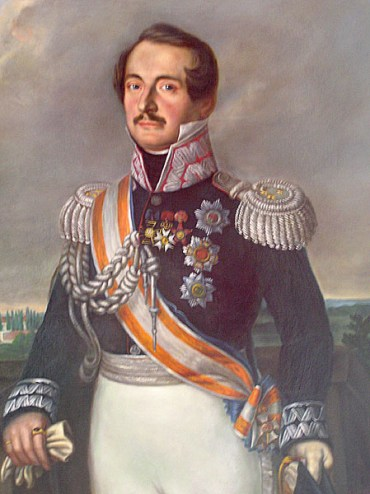
Antoni Paweł Sułkowski

Throughout May and June, the siege was characterized by heavy fighting around Wolfsberg sconce east of Kolberg.

In early May, the siege forces numbered circa 8,000 troops. The siege force's blockade corps was since 4 May divided into four brigades:

- the first brigade was commanded by Berndes and included one Polish regiment under Antoni Paweł Sułkowski. Sułkowski in his diaries wrote that Polish soldiers were highly excited about the prospect of taking the city, as it was once part of Poland during the Piast dynasty. He wrote "our soldiers burn with the enthusiasm to move our borders to the pillars of Bolesław", and noted that the chaplain of the Polish soldiers Ignacy Przybylski called upon them Polish soldiers. We are camped under Kołobrzeg. Since the time of Chrobry our regiment formed in Poznań and Gniezno Voivodeships is the first to show its banners here. The brigade also included Württemberg regiments (Seckendorff, Romig);
- the second brigade was commanded by Fontane and included the 1st Italian line infantry regiment (Valleriani) and the infantry regiment Saxe-Weimar (Egloffstein);
- the third brigade was commanded by Castaldini and included the 2nd Italian light regiment;
- the fourth brigade was commanded by general Bonfanti and included the 1st Italian light regiment (Rougier).
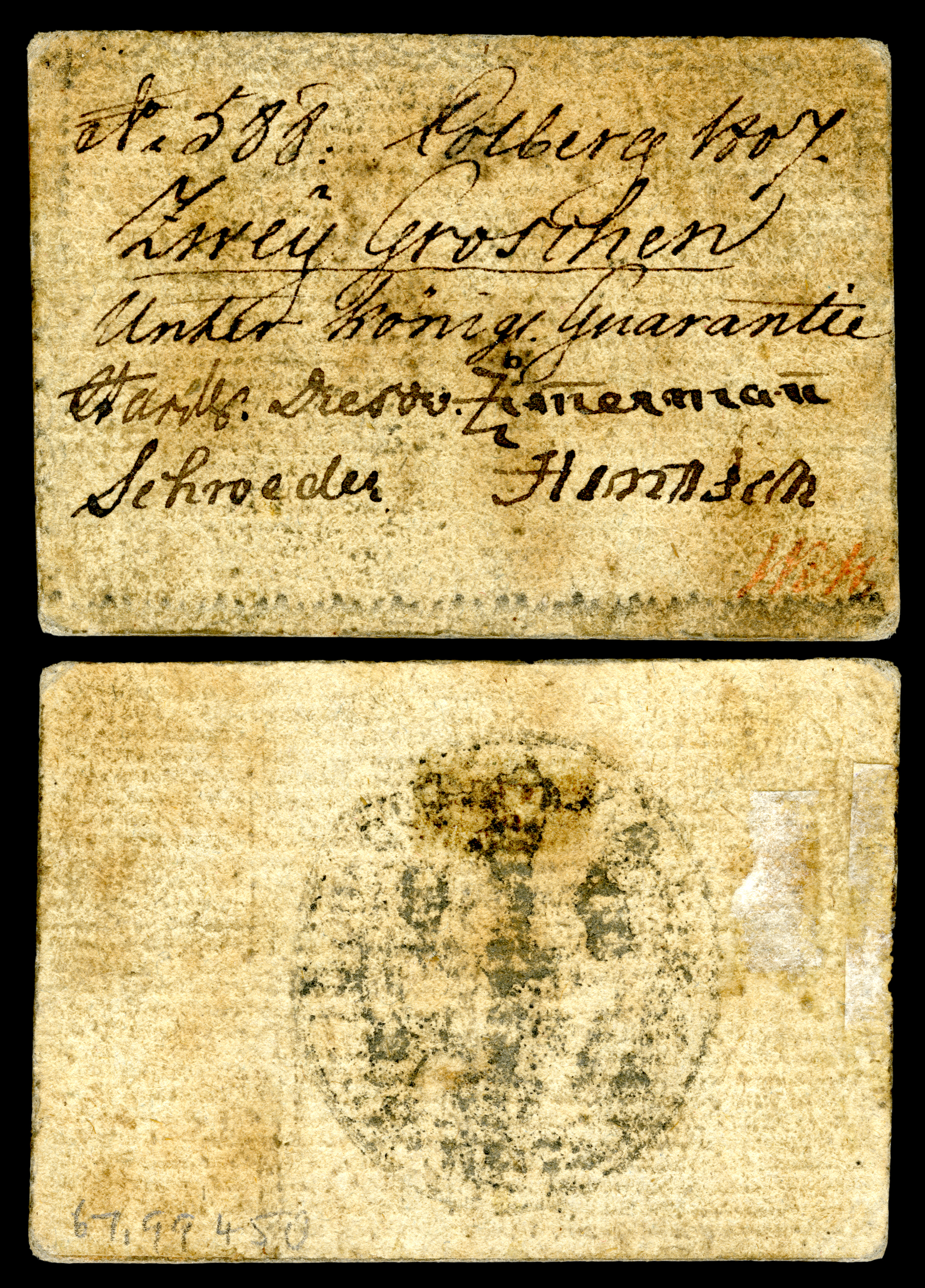
Emergency issue currency for the siege of Kolberg – 2 groschen
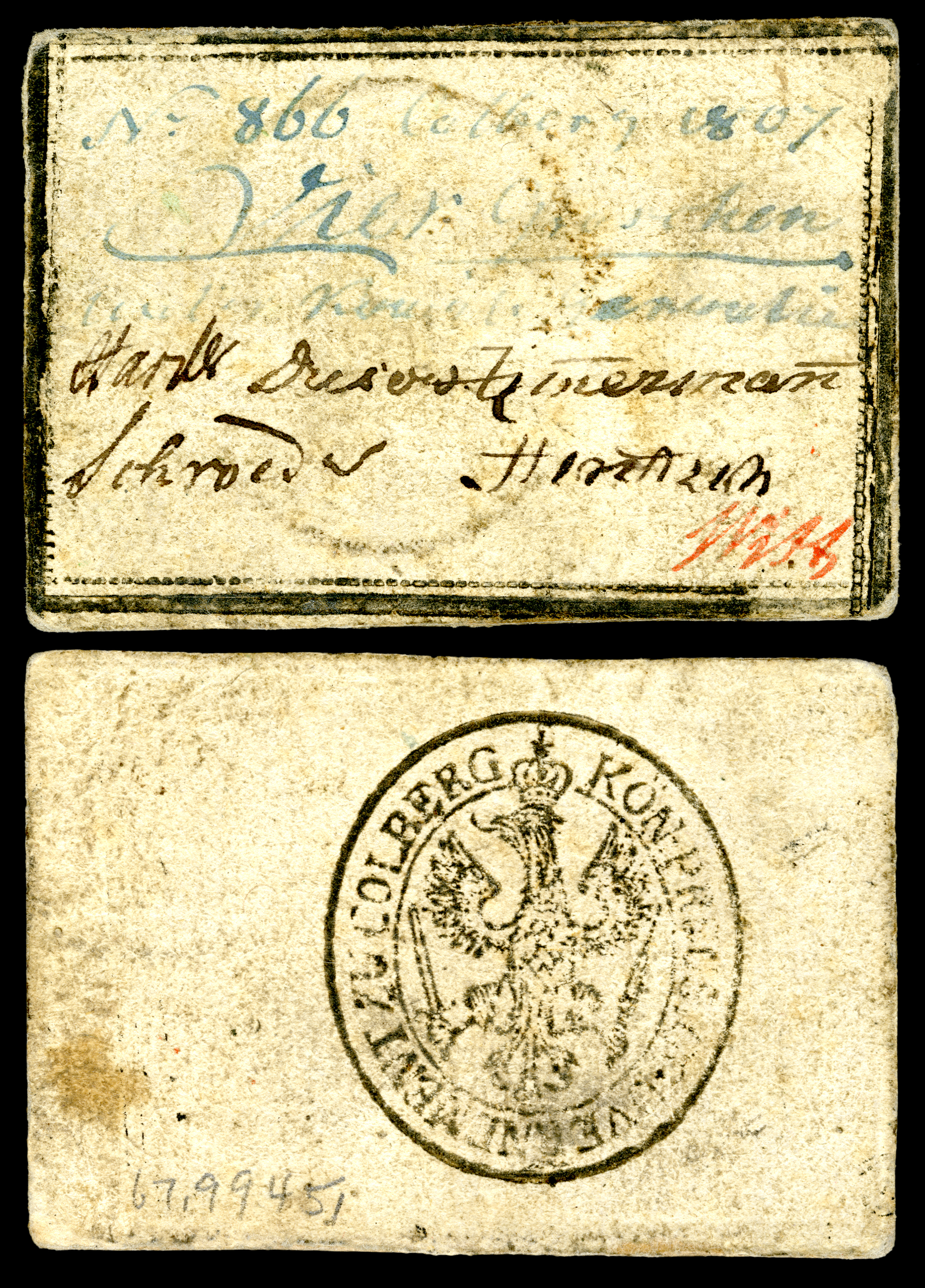
4 groschen
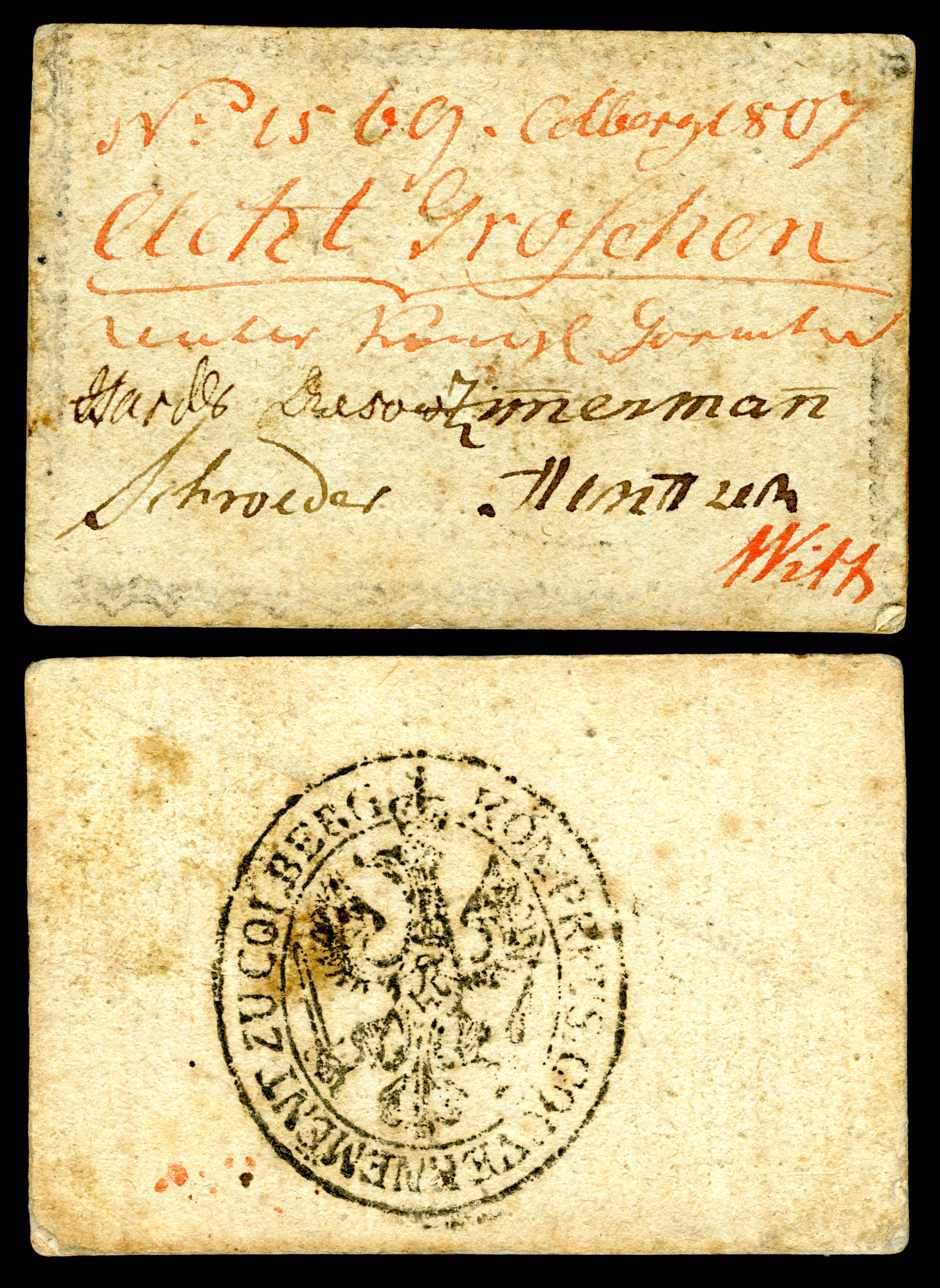
8 groschen

The remaining forces, except for the grenadiers, were entrusted with the defense of other sconces in the vicinity of Kolberg. The headquarters of the siege force was in Tramm (now Stramnica), where the grenadiers were concentrated. The artillery, under command of general Mossel, was concentrated near Zernin (now Czernin), and defended by a Saxon detachment stationed in Degow (now Dygowo). The construction of the siege works, was since 5 May supervised by brigade general Chambarlhiac of the 8th corps on Napoleon's behalf.

Schill returned to the town in early May, but left for Stralsund again after discord with Gneisenau, taking most of his freikorps with him (primarily the cavalry units). After Schill's departure, the defenders numbered about 6,000 men and consisted of

- one grenadier battalion with 850 men, commanded by Karl Wilhelm Ernst von Waldenfels, vice commander of the fortress;
- one fusilier battalion with 750 men, commanded by Möller;
- the 2nd Pomeranian reserve battalion with 540 men;
- the 3rd Neumark reserve battalion with 420 men;
- the 3rd musketeer battalion von Owstien with 800 men;
- the 3rd musketeer battalion von Borcke with 800 men;
- of Schill's freikorps, five infantry companies with 750 men and one cavalry squadron with 113 men, commanded by Count Wedell;
- two Jäger companies (Dobrowolski and Otto) with 300 men, later commanded by Arenstorf;
- 110 cuirassiers from the depot of the von Balliodz regiment;
- 400 artillerists.

On 7 May, in a French reconnaissance attack, troops from the 1st Italian line infantry as well as the Polish, Württemberg and Saxon regiments assaulted Wolfsberg sconce. During the fight, a Polish unit repelled a charge from the cavalry squadron of Schill's Freikorps (113 troopers). General Loison in a report to Marshal Berthier on 8 May stated that the Poles had stopped a charge of 600 Prussian cavalry in that action. In another attack, launched during the night of 17/18 May, siege force troops managed to take part of Wolfsberg sconce, but had to retreat when in the resulting chaos, Württemberg troops shot at Italian units. The Prussian forces launched a counter-attack and drove them from the sconce once again. After this, the French general lost confidence in Wurttemberg troops and removed them from the battlefield. Polish troops were extensively used, and according to Louis Loison, showed exceptional determination in the attacks on Wolfsberg sconce.

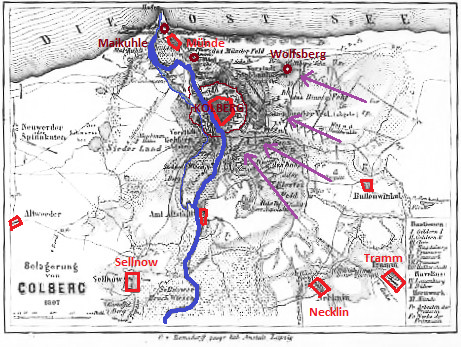
Plan of the siege. Purple: French trenches; dark areas around Kolberg: flooded and rubble of burned suburbs.

On 20 May, an arms replenishment for the defenders arrived by sea from Great Britain, containing inter alia 10,000 rifles, 6,000 sabres and ammunition. Some of those supplies, including 6,000 rifles, were however redirected to the defenders of Stralsund.

On 30 May, Napoleon ordered the redeployment of Jean Boudet's division to enable it to reach Kolberg on demand within 36 hours, one regiment of the division was ordered to reinforce the siege forces.

Wolfsberg sconce, overrun by the French army on 17 May but recovered by the defenders the next day, capitulated on 11 June. Among others, Waldenfels was killed at the Wolfsberg sconce. Also, Teulié was lethally injured when a cannonball hit his leg—according to the French Biographie universelle, he died five days later, on 12 May, and his death caused the parties to agree on a 24-hour truce in his honor; according to Höpfner's History of the Prussian Army however, Teuliè was hit when a 24-hour truce on 11/12 June was concluded after the capitulation of the Wolfsberg sconce, but not observed; and according to the Italian Biografie di Pietro Teulie however, the cannonball hit Teuliè after 13 June, and five to six days later, he died in Loison's arms in the nearby village of Tramm.

Temporarily, the defenders were supported by the British corvette Phyleria and the Swedish frigate af Chapmann, the latter had arrived on 29 April, was commanded by major Follin and armed with 46 guns (two 36-pounders, else 24-pounder cannons and carronades). Also, three fishing boats had been armed with guns and supported the defenders from the sea. A 3-pounder gun was mounted on each of these boats, which had been prepared by Nettelbeck; later, a fourth boat was similarly prepared by lieutenant Fabe. On 3 June during the evening the supporting ships directed artillery fire on the Polish camp, which proved to be ineffective due to strong winds, three hours later an armed expedition of estimated 200 Prussians attempted to land on the beach, and was repulsed in intense fighting by the Polish regiment

On 14 June, British artillery replenishments arrived for the defenders, including 30 iron cannons, 10 iron howitzers and ammunition. The guns replaced "the many unusable guns on Kolberg's walls". Since the fortress had experienced a shortage of light artillery while at the same time it had sufficient cannonball supplies in storage, a Kolberg smith had forged an operative iron 4-pounder gun; further efforts to forge artillery pieces in the fortress were rendered moot by the arrival of the British guns.

=== Final days ===
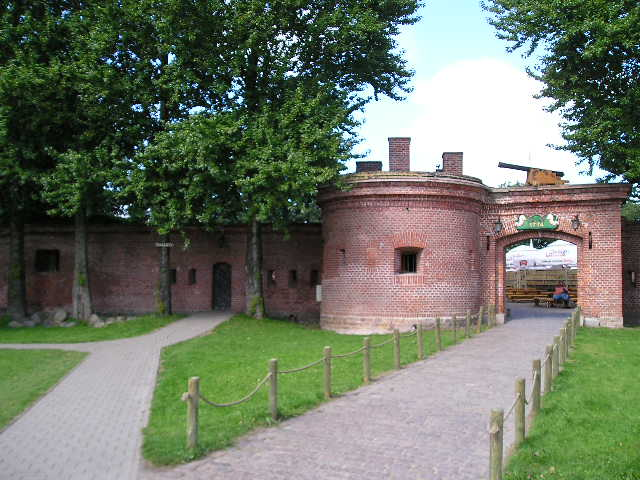
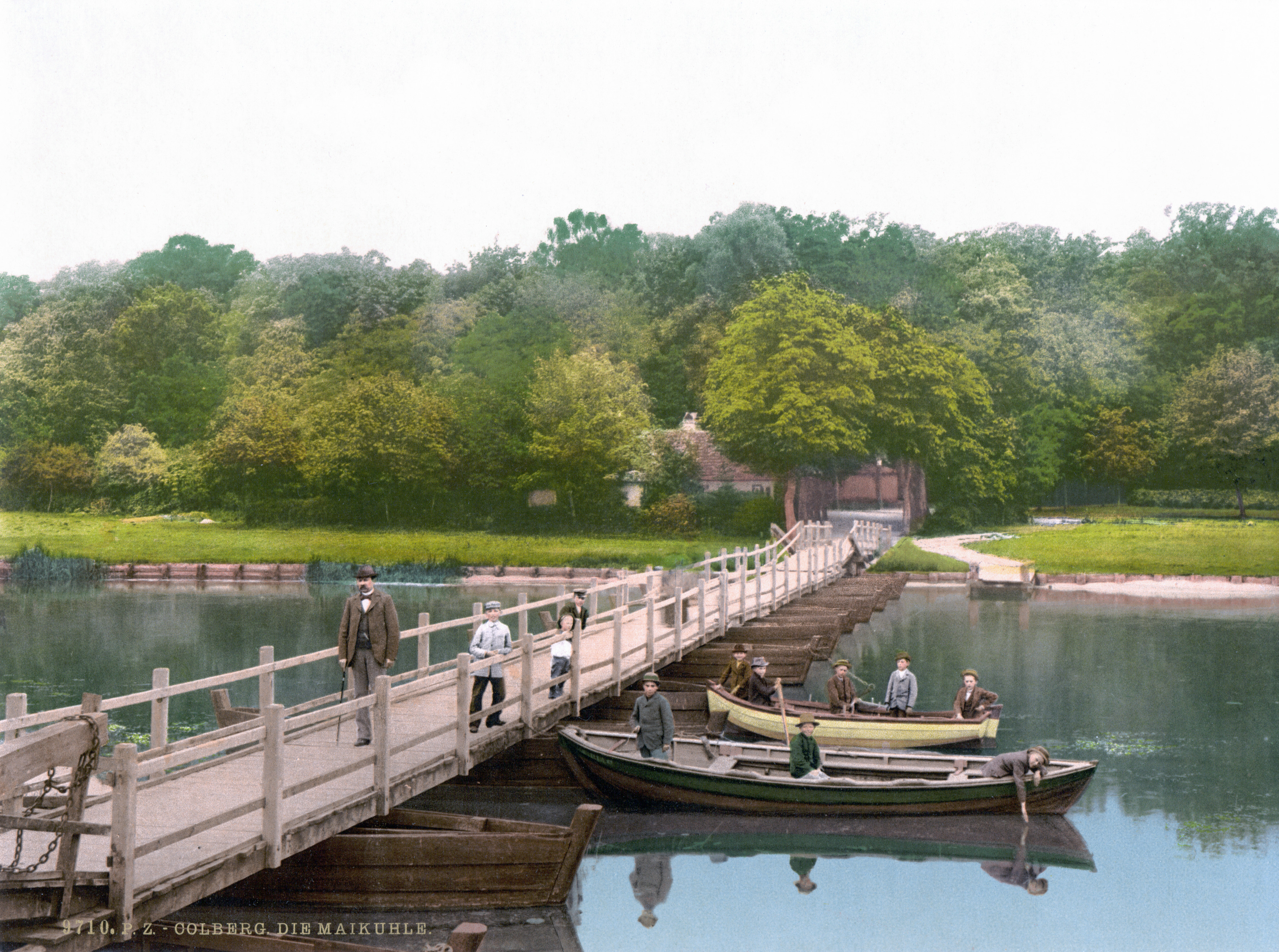
Left: Bagienna/Morast/Schill redoubt; right: Maikuhle

In mid-June, the siege forces were reinforced by two Nassau bataillons with a strength of 1,500 to 1,600, Napoleon ordered the narrowing of the encirclement to cut off Kolberg from its port. By the end of June, Napoleon sent in battle-tried French regiments and heavy guns to bring about a decision: on 21 June arrived further artillery pieces and the 4th Dutch line infantry regiment (Anthing's) with a strength of 1,600 to 1,700; on 30 June arrived the 3rd light, 56th line and 93rd line regiments of the Boudet division with a strength of 7,000. Overall, the strength of the siege force had risen to about 14,000 men in the final days.

The French forces took the Maikuhle forest held by the remaining soldiers of Schill's freikorps on 1 July. Kolberg was heavily bombarded—of a total of 25,940 cannonballs fired by the siege force, 6,000 were fired on 1 and 2 July.

On 2 July at noon, fighting ceased upon the announcement of the Prusso-French agreement to the Peace of Tilsit. A Prusso-French truce had been signed already on 25 June following the decisive Russian defeat in the Battle of Friedland. Kolberg was one of the few Prussian fortresses which withstood Napoleon's forces until the peace was signed—others were Glatz (Kłodzko) and Graudenz (Grudziądz).

=== Casualties ===
Based on data from the Prussian Military Archive, Höpfner lists the casualties for the Prussian garrison of Kolberg (saying it is uncertain whether they included the losses of the Schill freikorps) as follows:

	Officers	Corporals	Privates
killed in action:	14	23	391
lethally wounded:	7	28	253
wounded:	27	104	912
captured:	6	6	192
missing:	0	10	149
deserted:	0	18	316
discharged as invalids:	1	24	380
total:	55	213	2,593

Höpfner further reports that

- Schill's freikorps lost a total of 682 infantry, 40 artillerists and an unrecorded number of cavalry and jäger as dead, wounded, captured or missing;
- of the civilian population of Kolberg, 27 died and 42 were wounded, primarily during the two final days.

Regarding the casualties of the siege force, Höpfner says that the Prussian archives reports list a total of 7,000 to 8,000 dead and wounded, 1,000 of whom were killed and injured during the last two days. Höpfner does not cite the number claimed by the French, which he dismissed as "worthless," and says that the beforementioned Prussian claim for the total siege force casualties might be exaggerated.

The casualty figures cited by Smith in The Greenhill Napoleonic Wars Data Book match Höpfner's numbers for the Prussian garrison, as they were used as a source; for the siege force casualties, Smith lists 102 officers and 5,000 men dead and wounded or died of sickness.

== Aftermath ==
After the announcement of the peace, Kolberg was not occupied by the French army. Already on 3/4 July, Napoleon ordered the bulk of the siege force to march west to Swedish Pomerania and reinforce, under command of Guillaume Brune, the French forces besieging Stralsund. The commander of the siege forces in Kolberg, Louis Henri Loison, likewise departed to the Stralsund pocket and was put in command of a division near Demmin. Ferdinand von Schill and Neidhardt von Gneisenau received the highest Prussian military decoration "Pour le Mérite" for their service.

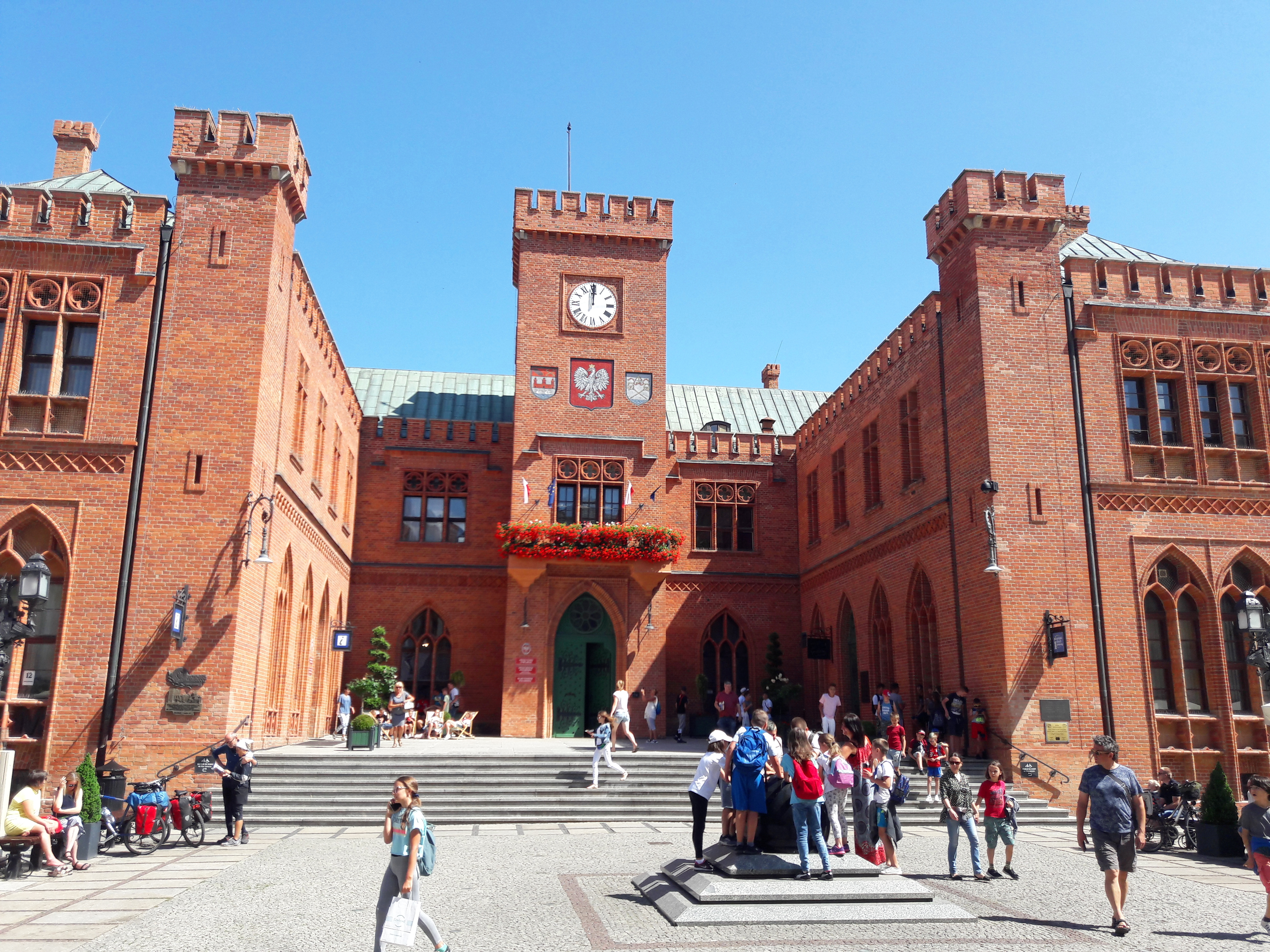
Schinkel's town hall

During the siege, Kolberg's suburbs had been levelled, more than half of the Old Town was damaged or destroyed by artillery fire, and Kolberg's economy with its two important branches sea trade and salt mining declined. A shortage of coins had led to the circulation of paper money, hand-written by students from the local lyceum on Gneisenau's behalf. The overall damage was at 155,000 reichstalers. Only in the mid-19th century began the reconstruction and modernization of the town and its port. The ruins of the destroyed medieval town hall were replaced by the current building, designed by Karl Friedrich Schinkel. Kolberg ceased to be a fortress in 1872—by 1873, most of the defensive works were levelled.

=== In popular memory ===
The siege itself became a myth in military history of Prussia, which was partially deflated in modern research by Hieronim Kroczyński. Nobel laureate Paul Heyse described the events in his successful drama "Colberg" (1865).

Before World War II, a monument in the town's center was dedicated to Gneisenau, Nettelbeck and Schill; Schill's house was marked with a memorial plaque, a redoubt and a street were named after him, and 2 July was a local holiday celebrated by an annual procession. After the war, when the town became Polish, a street in Kołobrzeg was named after Antoni Sułkowski, the commander of the Polish troops taking part in the siege.

=== Nazi propaganda movie ===
Paul Heyse's drama was exploited in the Nazi propaganda movie Kolberg, which was begun in 1943 and released in 1945 near the end of World War II. At a cost of more than eight million marks, it was the most expensive German film of the Second World War. Part of the plot did not match the events—for example, while the actual siege had ended because Prussia surrendered, in the movie it ended because the French generals concluded Kolberg could not be taken. Some 5,000 soldiers were employed as extras in its shooting, as well as several hundred townspeople from the city of Kolberg itself.

== Notes ==
Preceded by Battle of Ostrołęka (1807)	Napoleonic Wars; Siege of Kolberg (1807)	Succeeded by Siege of Danzig (1807)
