= Giuseppe Lahoz Ortiz =

Italian general and patriot (1766–1799)

- Born: 1766; Mantua, Duchy of Mantua, Austrian Empire
- Died: 13 October 1799 (aged 32–33); Ancona, Roman Republic
- Military career
- Allegiance: Habsburg Monarchy; Cisalpine Republic (1796–1798)
- Rank: Brigadier general
- Nickname: Giuseppe La Hoz
- Conflicts: French Revolutionary Wars; Italian campaigns; Siege of Ancona †

Giuseppe Lahoz Ortiz, also known as Giuseppe La Hoz (1766 – 13 October 1799), was an Italian general, Jacobin and patriot. He served in the army of the Habsburg Monarchy, later joined the army of the Cisalpine Republic, and subsequently participated in the Italian anti-French insurrections of 1799.

== Early life ==
Giuseppe Lahoz Ortiz was born in 1766 in Mantua to an aristocratic family of Spanish origin who had moved to Lombardy.

== Career ==
He began his military career in the Austrian imperial army. In 1796, when Napoleon descended into Italy, having embraced Jacobin ideas, he abandoned the Austrian army to join the French one (at that time he was given the age of thirty; however, his place of birth was not recorded).

=== Napoleonic general ===
Lahoz became commander of Napoleon's Lombard Legion and, after distinguishing himself in the repression of the Venetian insurrections, he was appointed brigadier general of the Cisalpine army in April 1797. After the Treaty of Campo Formio he became one of the most ardent opponents of French policy in Italy: in fact, he was one of the major opponents of the coup d'état of the French ambassador in Milan Claude-Joseph Trouvé (30 August 1798) and went to Paris to protest against the Directory's policy towards the Cisalpine Republic.

=== Insurgent ===
Thus disillusioned with the French, Giuseppe Lahoz abandoned the uniform of the French army and joined the Italian insurgents and in May 1799 the anti-French rebels of the Marches appointed him their military leader. Under Lahoz's leadership, for almost six months the insurrection of the Marches took on the appearance of a real war between armies, also due to the arrival of a Russo-Turkish fleet on 17 May 1799 off the coast of Ancona, the city where the French army of General Monnier had taken refuge.

== Death and legacy ==
Giuseppe Lahoz died on 13 October 1799 of wounds received in combat during a sortie carried out by the besieged French on 10 October 1799. The sudden change of sides has led some to speculate that Lahoz had long been a conspirator for Italian independence, founder of the "Society of the Rays".
