= Ezekiel Baker =

Ezekiel Baker (1758–1836) was an English master gunsmith from Whitechapel, London, who became known for his design of the Baker rifle in 1800.

Baker was apprenticed to gunsmith Henry Nock and opened a gunshop of his own at 24 Whitechapel Road, London in 1775. He later wrote a book on his experiences when making and using rifles.

== The Baker rifle ==
The British Army had been experimenting with rifles since the American Revolutionary War, but had found all available rifle designs either too fragile, cumbersome or slow firing to be able to use in a generalised war. On 4 February 1800, a number of leading gun makers were invited to Woolwich to trial their rifle designs by the Board of Ordnance, who were responsible for the procurement of weaponry for the army. Baker's design was chosen, and he was given an initial order for 800 rifles. In the same year, an "Experimental Corps of Riflemen" was raised by Colonel Coote Manningham and Lieutenant-Colonel the Hon. William Stewart. The corps was manned by volunteer officers and soldiers from a variety of British regiments and militias, and would soon be renamed and normalised into the army under the name the 95th Rifles Regiment of Foot.

By 1810, five British battalions, three of the 95th and two of the 60th Regiments, as well as several light companies of the King's German Legion were equipped with the Baker rifle. The rifle was renowned for its accuracy and range. It was used throughout the Napoleonic Wars and continued in service until the 1830s.

== Sources ==
- Baker, Ezekiel (2010) [1804]. Twenty-three Years Practice and Observations with Rifle Guns. Kessinger Publishing. ISBN 978-1-166-27060-5.
- Henderson, Robert. Loading and Firing the British Army Baker Rifle, 1799 - 1815.
