= The Recollections of Rifleman Harris =

1848 memoir by Benjamin Randell Harris

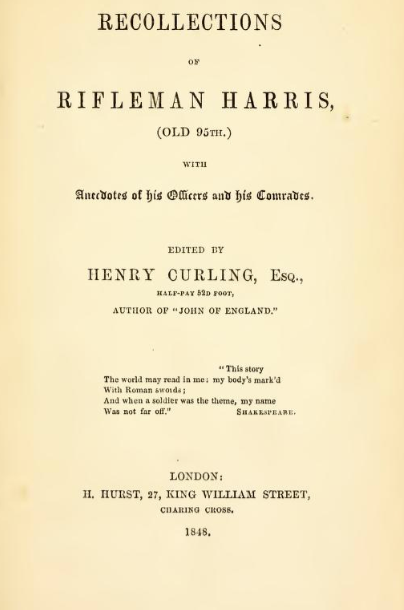
- Title page for The Recollections of Rifleman Harris (1848)
- Author: Benjamin Randell Harris
- Language: English
- Genre: memoir
- Publication date: 1848

The Recollections of Rifleman Harris is a memoir published in 1848, which claims to reflect the experiences of an enlisted soldier in the 95th Regiment of Foot in the British Army during the Napoleonic Wars. The eponymous soldier was Benjamin Randell Harris, a private who joined the regiment in 1803 and served in many of the early campaigns in the Peninsular War. In the mid-1830s, Harris was working as a cobbler in London when he met an acquaintance, Captain Henry Curling, who asked him to dictate an account of his experiences of army life. This account was then held by Curling until 1848, when he succeeded in getting the manuscript published, preserving one of the very few surviving accounts of military service in this era that claims to have originated with a private soldier. However, as Harris himself was illiterate, it remains unclear how far the text reflects his own views, and how far it reflects the views of Curling, the author of the written account. Even the description of the text's origins comes from Curling, meaning that it is impossible to know what Harris himself actually said or felt about the events which the diaries describe.

== The memoir ==
The account begins with a description of Harris' recruitment in the army via the militia and the 66th Regiment of Foot in Stalbridge, from where he was sent on garrison duty to Ireland and joined the 95th Rifles. The account reveals many details of army life in the period, including a graphic depiction of an execution by firing squad and a description of the actions and progress of a recruiting party through Ireland, which reveals the endemic alcoholism and religious rivalry which Ireland and the army of the time was subject to. Harris notes particular difficulty in separating Catholic and Protestant Irish recruits.

=== Denmark ===
Harris was sent to Denmark in 1807, where he participated in the campaign which surrounded the bombardment of Copenhagen, including seeing his first fighting near Køge and observing Congreve rockets in action for the first time. Harris also recounts further experiences of drunkenness and ill-discipline amongst the largely inexperienced soldiery. He also served in 1808 with several men who had participated in the South American expedition of 1807, and offers comment and anecdotes on that campaign and the subsequent trial of General John Whitelocke, whom Harris holds in contempt.

=== The Peninsula ===
In the summer of 1808 Harris was dispatched to Portugal to participate in the opening actions of the Peninsula War, seeing action in the opening skirmish at Óbidos and subsequently the Battle of Roliça, where Harris' unit was heavily engaged and Harris offers a vivid description of the engagement, at which a number of his close friends were killed. This is followed by a description of the Battle of Vimeiro where he was again heavily engaged and follows the army on the ensuing march to Salamanca and the clash with the French at Sahagún. This is followed by a graphic depiction of the horrific march northwards during the Galician campaign culminating in the Battle of Corunna. Harris and his regiment were amongst the final troops evacuated from the beaches, and they returned to England, where Harris served in recruitment and training positions, thus providing readers with a rare insight into rural Georgian England from a lower class perspective.

=== Walcheren and illness ===
From England Harris and the 95th were sent to Walcheren to participate in the catastrophic Walcheren Expedition. The narrator acutely demonstrates the squalid conditions and indecisive generalship which led to the ensuing disaster in the marshy land and high summer of Holland. Harris himself fell ill from the ague which killed two-thirds of the expeditionary force, and thus also provides an insight into the medical care and treatments available to soldiers during the Georgian period, a disease from which he never fully recovered. For the next three years, despite determined efforts to rejoin his unit in Spain, Harris was unable to participate in the wars due to his recurring malarial fevers. During this period of inactivity and ill-health at the depot in Hythe, Harris recounts many stories told to him by his comrades and contemporaries of their service on the Peninsula, including tales of the Siege of Badajoz and the Siege of San Sebastián.

In 1813 and 1814, Harris was attached to the 8th Veteran's Battalion based in London, having been rejected from foreign service by the Duke of Wellington, who decreed no survivors of Walcheren were to serve in his army as none were fit for marching or fighting. There he served alongside several detachments of French deserters, again witnessing the frequent brutal punishment of the day, when a man was given 700 lashes for desertion. Stricken with illness, he was unable to rejoin his regiment during the Hundred Days Campaign and thus forfeited his pension. Nonetheless, Harris' final words on the subject are very revealing. "I enjoyed life more whilst on active service than I have ever done since, and I look back on my time spent on the fields of the Peninsula as the only part worthy of remembrance".

== Importance ==
The book is perhaps most important in the manner in which it claims to provide the viewpoint of one of Wellington's foot soldiers at a time when so many were illiterate. Whilst some officers kept diaries or wrote memoirs of their service, The Recollections of Rifleman Harris is rare because unlike the grand actions or great people recalled by his superiors, Harris mentions dozens of men whose history is no longer remembered and whose names would otherwise be lost, and records the details of daily ennui with interesting and colloquial prose. He describes medicine from a patient's point of view, punishment from a friend of the victim's view, and military life from the bottom up, giving insight to the daily life of a soldier in the Napoleonic Wars, as well as a valuable primary source to some of the British campaigns of the period. However, this uniqueness is also cause for some suspicion about the authorship and intentions of the text.

== Critical reception ==
During Harris' life the book was neither popular nor well-received critically, fading into obscurity for many years before being rediscovered in the early years of the twentieth century. The book has since been republished many times, with a number of commentaries, some rather poorly researched, even reporting Harris' first name as John. In more recent times a freshly researched volume by historian Eileen Hathaway has been published which removes many of the older mistakes and contains a foreword by the author Bernard Cornwell, who used the memoir as a source for his Sharpe series, even basing a minor character on Harris, albeit with a very different career. Likewise in the Sharpe TV series, the actor Jason Salkey played a rifleman very loosely based on Benjamin Harris. Salkey later recorded an audiobook version of The Recollections of Rifleman Harris.

== See also ==
- Jakob Walter

== Sources ==
- Recollections of rifleman Harris, (old 95th) with anecdotes of his officers and his comrades (1848), Full Text on Archive.org.
- The Recollections of Rifleman Harris as told to Henry Curling, 1848, Edited and introduction by Christopher Hibbert, The Military Book Society by Leo Cooper Ltd, 1970 ISBN 085052-005-3 .
- The Recollections of Rifleman Harris, Benjamin Harris and Henry Curling, 1848. Republished with notes as A Dorset Rifleman, Eileen Hathaway, Shinglepicker, 1995, ISBN 0-9522782-2-7
- The Recollections of Rifleman Harris public domain audiobook at LibriVox
