= Benjamin Randell Harris =

British soldier and memorist (1781–1858)

- Born: 28 October 1781; Portsea, Portsmouth, Hampshire
- Died: After 1848
- Military career
- Allegiance: United Kingdom
- Branch: British Army
- Service years: 1803 - 1814
- Rank: Rifleman
- Units: 66th Regiment of Foot; 95th Rifles
- Conflicts: Napoleonic Wars; Gunboat War; Battle of Copenhagen; Battle of Køge; Peninsular War; Battle of Óbidos; Battle of Roliça; Battle of Vimeiro; Retreat to Vigo; War of the Fifth Coalition; Walcheren Campaign
- Awards: Military General Service Medal

Benjamin Randell Harris (28 October 1781 – after 1848) was a British infantryman who served in the British Army during the Napoleonic Wars. He is most widely remembered today as the author of a memoir of his time in the army entitled The Recollections of Rifleman Harris (1848), which has been seen as giving a rare insight into the world of the enlisted man in Wellington's army. Most memoirs published after the war came from serving officers, and the experiences of ordinary soldiers were overlooked due to the illiteracy of so many people at that time.

Harris himself was illiterate. His recollections were recorded in the 1830s by an officer who knew him, named Captain Henry Curling. Curling himself is the only source for this encounter. Curling later wrote that he kept the manuscript based on their conversation until 1848, when he succeeded in getting it published.

== Early life ==
Benjamin Harris is vague about his origins in his text, but investigations by Eileen Hathaway have revealed that he was born in Portsea, Portsmouth, Hampshire to Robert and Elizabeth Harris around 28 October 1781. The Harris family however were shepherds and farmers from Stalbridge in North Dorset, and it was here that Benjamin grew up, in a large family with whom he remained until 1803. Many of his relatives served with the Dorset Militia during the Seven Years' War, American Revolution, and Napoleonic Wars, including his 1st cousin, Daniel Harris (1779–1833).

In 1803 Harris was drafted into the 66th Regiment of Foot somewhat against his will, and forcibly marched to Winchester, where he underwent training in preparation for deployment against the French as the Peace of Amiens was drawing to a close. It was whilst stationed there that he was randomly selected as part of a firing squad to execute a deserter, an action which he reports "for many years afterwards remained deeply impressed on my mind". Shortly afterwards he was despatched as a garrison force to Ireland, and served duty in Cork and in Dublin, where he met and joined a newly formed regiment, the 95th Regiment of Foot, the now famous green-jacketed riflemen.

From Ireland, Harris was returned to England following a period with a recruiting party, and rapidly settled into regimental life, learning to become a cobbler in addition to his regular duties, by which means he made a substantial amount of money which later enabled him to afford medical treatment which saved his life. Harris' first experience of military service came in 1807, when he participated in the brief land campaign which accompanied the Bombardment of Copenhagen. He saw action in the skirmish at Køge (which was also the first action of the Duke of Wellington following his return from India). Soon afterwards, he and his unit returned to England on captured Danish vessels.

=== Peninsular War ===
Harris was soon moving again, sailing to Portugal to participate in the opening actions of the British involvement in the Peninsular War. Harris was at the very first action, a skirmish at the town of Óbidos, where he saw Lieutenant Ralph Bunbury fall, the first British casualty of the war. On 17 August 1808 he was in the hotly contested skirmish line at Battle of Roliça, and saw serious opposition for the first time, reporting it as an exhilarating and terrifying experience. Many of his companions were killed at this action and the ensuing Battle of Vimeiro, but Harris remained unhurt, continuing the march to Salamanca before becoming trapped in northern Spain with the rest of Sir John Moore's army. The Light Brigade of Robert Craufurd, which included the 2nd/95th, did not march with the rest of the army to Corunna but marched to Vigo. The sights and horrors of the march remained with him for decades to come, and he was lucky to escape, claiming to be the very last man collected from the beaches at Vigo, and embarking for England in a severely weakened state.

=== Walcheren ===
The biggest upheaval in Harris' life was the disastrous 1809 Walcheren Expedition, in which a British force was sent to the islands of Walcheren off the Dutch coast with the aim of destroying the dykes and lock gates there to render the port of Antwerp unusable for the French navy. The expedition totally failed, as it was unable to take any of the island's major towns and bivouacked in squalid conditions during the summer, resulting in a plague of malaria and typhoid which killed over 4,000 soldiers and permanently disabled 12,000 from a force of 40,000. Harris was amongst those disabled, spending months in plague wards from which he was never expected to recover, and on at least one occasion only surviving through the extra medical care he received thanks to his financial reserves. Although he was recalled to his regiment in 1810 for service in Spain, he was unable to attend due to recurring bouts of malaria, and spent much of the period between 1809 and 1814 in hospitals or his father's home in Stalbridge, especially after Wellington had decreed that no men who served in Walcheren were to be sent to the Peninsula as they were unfit for further service. Those few months when he was able to live normally he spent in London with Veterans Battalions of unfit and wounded men, including numerous French deserters.

== Later life ==
Since Harris was unfit to rejoin his unit in the Hundred Days campaign in 1815, the War Office withdrew his pension. This left Harris with no choice but to reenter the work force as a cobbler, which trade he plied in London. In the 1830s an acquaintance, Captain Henry Curling, found him as a worker in a cobblers and bootmakers in the city and persuaded him to relate his war experiences, which Curling collected into a manuscript.

Harris disappears from the historical record not long after this, but it is known that he owned his own cobbling shop in London between 1836 and 1839 and was alive to see his manuscript published in 1848, because in that year he received the Military General Service Medal with the two clasps for Roleia and Vimiera in 1808. Nothing more is known of Harris' life or death, and his memoirs were not well known at the time, only becoming well read much later by historians of the twentieth century. Harris did however leave a postscript to his manuscript, which reads:

"I enjoyed life more whilst on active service than I have ever done since, and I look back on my time spent on the fields of the Peninsula as the only part worthy of remembrance."

== In fiction ==
The television series based on the Sharpe novels of Bernard Cornwell featured a rifleman named Harris, portrayed as a down-at-heel intellectual often to be found eagerly reading the works of the great French writers of the period. The character is killed at the Battle of Waterloo. Although this character was not intended to represent the real Benjamin Harris, there are a number of small details and lines of dialogue that were included as references to the historical person - he is shown repairing his comrades' shoes, and his commanding officer suggests that, in order to get rich, he write a book about his soldiering days, "full of battles and death".

The Recollections of Rifleman Harris was published as an audio book, as read by Jason Salkey, who had portrayed the Harris character in the Sharpe films.

== See also ==
- Rifleman Green
