= Baker rifle =

Pattern 1800 Infantry Rifle
- A Baker rifle owned by the Smithsonian Institution
- Type: Muzzle-loading rifle
- Place of origin: Great Britain

Service history
- In service: 1801–1837 (British Army)
- Used by: United Kingdom; Kingdom of Hanover; Portugal; Brazil; United States; Mexico
- Wars: French Revolutionary Wars; Napoleonic Wars; War of 1812; Brazilian War of Independence; Texas Revolution; Second French intervention in Mexico; Australian frontier wars Kaffir Wars

Production history
- Designed: 1798–1800
- Produced: 1800–1838 (all variants)
- No. built: 22,000+
- Variants: Cavalry carbine

Specifications
- Mass: 9 lb (4.08 kg)
- Length: 45 3/4 in (1162 mm)
- Barrel length: 30.375 in. (762 mm)
- Cartridge: 0.615 in. (15.6 mm) lead ball
- Caliber: 0.625 in (15.9 mm)
- Action: Flintlock
- Rate of fire: User dependent, Usually 2+ rounds a minute
- Muzzle velocity: Variable
- Effective firing range: Variable
- Feed system: Muzzle loaded

The Pattern 1800 Infantry Rifle, better known as the Baker rifle, was a flintlock rifle designed by English gunsmith Ezekiel Baker and used by the British Armed Forces from 1801 to 1837. First seeing action during the French Revolutionary and Napoleonic Wars, it was the first British-made firearm to be issued as a service rifle to all soldiers in the British Army's rifle units. The rifle was also used in the War of 1812, the Brazilian War of Independence and the Texas Revolution.

== History and design ==
The British Army had learnt the value of rifles from their experience in the American Revolutionary War. However, existing rifle designs were considered too cumbersome, slow-firing, fragile or expensive to be put to use on any scale beyond irregular companies. Rifles had been issued on a limited basis and consisted of parts made to no precise pattern, often brought in from Prussia. The war against Revolutionary France resulted in the employment of new tactics, and the British Army responded, albeit with some delay. Prior to the formation of an Experimental Rifle Corps in 1800, a trial was held at Woolwich by the British Board of Ordnance on 22 February 1800 in order to select a standard rifle pattern; the rifle designed by Ezekiel Baker was chosen. During the trial, of the twelve shots fired, eleven were placed in a 6-foot (1.8 m) circular target at a distance of 300 yards (270 m).

Colonel Coote Manningham, responsible for establishing the Rifle Corps, influenced the initial designs of the Baker. The first model resembled the British infantry musket ("Brown Bess"), but was rejected as too heavy. Baker was provided with a German Jäger rifle as an example of what was needed. The second model he made had a .75 caliber bore, the same caliber as the infantry musket. It had a 32-inch barrel, with eight rectangular rifling grooves; this model was accepted as the Infantry Rifle, but more changes were made until it was finally placed into production. The third and final model had the barrel shortened from 32 to 30 inches, and the caliber reduced to .653, which allowed the rifle to fire a .625 caliber carbine bullet, with a greased patch to grip the now-seven rectangular grooves in the barrel.

The rifle had a simple folding rear sight with the standard large lock mechanism (initially marked "Tower" and "G.R." under a crown; later ones after the battle of Waterloo had "Enfield"), with a swan-neck cock as fitted to the "Brown Bess". Like the German Jäger rifles, it had a scrolled brass trigger guard to help ensure a firm grip and a raised cheek-piece on the left-hand side of the butt. The stocks were made of walnut and held the barrel with three flat captive wedges. The rifle also had a metal locking bar to accommodate a 24-inch sword bayonet, similar to that of the Jäger rifle. The Baker was 45 inches from muzzle to butt, 12 inches shorter than the infantry musket, and weighed almost nine pounds. Although Infantry Muskets were not issued with cleaning kits, the Baker rifle had a cleaning kit, greased linen patches and tools, stored in the "butt-trap" or patch box; the lid of this was brass, and hinged at the rear so it could be flipped up. It was needed because, without regular cleaning, gunpowder fouling built up in the rifling grooves, and the weapon became much slower to load and less accurate.

After the Baker entered service, more modifications were made to the rifle and several variations were produced. A lighter and shorter carbine version for the cavalry was introduced, and a number of volunteer associations procured their own models, including the Duke of Cumberland's Corps of Sharpshooters, which ordered models with a 33-inch barrel, in August 1803. A second pattern of Baker Rifle was fitted with a "Newland" lock that had a flat-faced ring neck cock. In 1806, a third pattern was produced that included a "pistol grip" style trigger guard and a smaller patch box with a plain rounded front. The lock plate was smaller, flat, and had a steeped-down tail, a raised semi-waterproof pan, a flat ring neck cock, and a sliding safety bolt. With the introduction of a new pattern Short Land Pattern Flintlock Musket ('Brown Bess') in 1810, with its flat lock and ring-necked cock, the Baker's lock followed suit for what became the fourth pattern. It also featured a "slit stock"—the stock had a slot cut in its underpart just over a quarter-inch wide. This was done after Ezekiel Baker had seen reports of the ramrod jamming in the stock after the build-up of residue in the ramrod channel, and when the wood warped after getting wet.

The rifle is referred to almost exclusively as the "Baker Rifle", but it was produced by other manufacturers and sub-contractors from 1800 to 1837. Most of the rifles produced between 1800 and 1815 were not made by Ezekiel Baker, but under the Tower of London system, and he sub-contracted the manufacture of parts of the rifle to over 20 British gunsmiths. It was reported that many rifles sent to the British Army inspectors were not complete, to the extent of even having no barrel, since the rifle was sent on to another contractor for finishing. Ezekiel Baker's production during the period 1805–1815 was 712 rifles.

The Board of Ordnance, both of its own volition and at the behest of Infantry Staff Officers, ordered production modifications during the rifle's service life. Variations included a carbine with a safety catch and swivel-mounted ramrod, the 1801 pattern West India Rifle (a simplified version lacking a patch box), the 1809 pattern, which was .75 (musket) caliber, and the 1800/15, which was modified from existing stocks to use a socket bayonet. The most common field modification was the bent stock: riflemen in the field found that the stock was not bent sufficiently at the wrist to allow accurate firing, so stocks were bent by steaming. As this technique produces temporary results (lasting approximately five years), no examples found today exhibit this bend.

== Use ==
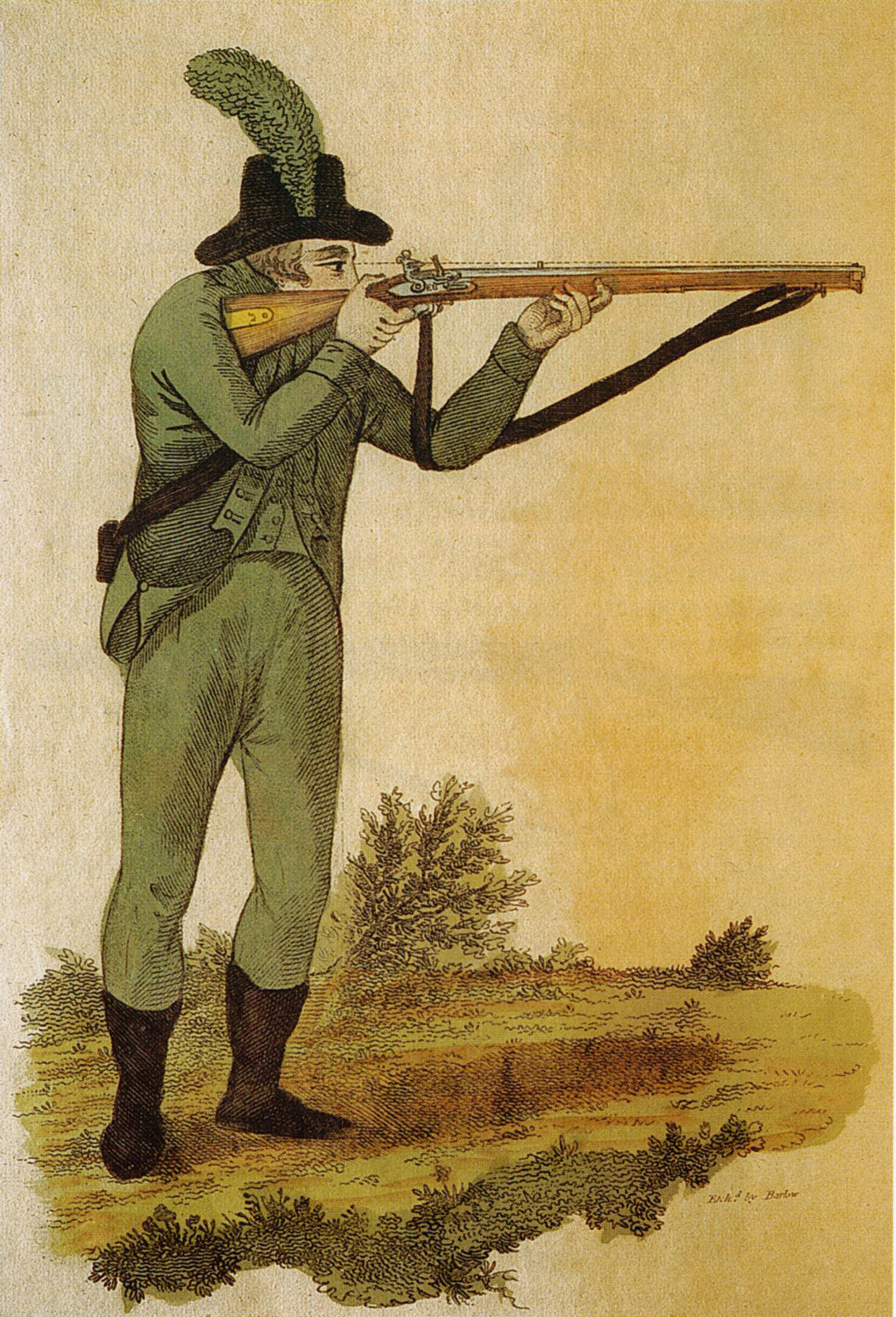
c. 1803 engraving of a British rifleman aiming with a Baker rifle

During the Napoleonic Wars the Baker was reported to be effective at long range due to its accuracy and dependability under battlefield conditions. In spite of its advantages, the rifle did not replace the standard British musket of the day, the Brown Bess, but was issued officially only to rifle regiments. In practice, however, many regiments, such as the 23rd Regiment of Foot (Royal Welch Fusiliers), and others, acquired rifles for use by some in their light companies during the time of the Peninsular War. These units were employed as an addition to the common practice of fielding skirmishers in advance of the main column, who were used to weaken and disrupt the waiting enemy lines (the French also had a light company in each battalion that was trained and employed as skirmishers but these were only issued with muskets). With the advantage of the greater range and accuracy provided by the Baker rifle, the highly trained British skirmishers were able to defeat their French counterparts routinely and in turn disrupt the main French force by sniping at officers and NCOs.

The rifle was used by what were considered elite units, such as the 5th battalion and rifle companies of the 6th and 7th Battalions of the 60th Regiment of Foot, deployed around the world, and the three battalions of the 95th Regiment of Foot that served under the Duke of Wellington between 1808 and 1814 in the Peninsular War, the War of 1812 (3rd Batt./95th (Rifles), at Battle of New Orleans), and again in 1815 at the Battle of Waterloo. The two light infantry Battalions of the King's German Legion as well as sharpshooter platoons within the Light Companies of the KGL Line Bns also used the Baker. Each of the Portuguese Caçadores battalions included an Atiradores (sharpshooters) company equipped with the Baker rifle. The rifle was also supplied to or privately purchased by numerous volunteer and militia units; these examples often differ from the regular issue pattern. Some variants were used by cavalry, including the 10th Hussars. The Baker was also used in Canada in the War of 1812. It is recorded that the British Army still issued Baker rifles in 1841 such as 21st Royal Scots Fusiliers who stationed in Australia since 1830s, three years after its production had ceased. Replaced by its successor, the Brunswick Rifle.

Several other countries used the rifle during the first half of the 19th century. Mexican forces at the Battle of the Alamo are known to have been carrying Baker rifles, as well as Brown Bess muskets, It is possible that some of these firearms were left in Texian possession subsequent to Cos' surrender. The M1800 Baker rifle remained in service with the Mexican forces alongside flintlock “Brown Bess” smoothbore muskets during the 1860s. They were also supplied to the government of Nepal, some of which were released from the stores of the Nepali Army in 2004, but many had deteriorated beyond recovery.

== Performance ==
=== Rate of fire ===
For accurate firing, a Baker rifle could not usually be reloaded as fast as a musket, as the slightly undersized lead balls had to be wrapped in patches of greased leather or linen so that they would more closely fit the lands of the rifling. The tight-fitting patched ball took considerable force and hence more time to seat properly inside a rifle's barrel, especially after repeated firing had fouled the barrel, compared to a loose fitting musket ball which could easily roll down. Initially, each rifleman was provided with a small mallet to help seat the ball inside the muzzle, but this later was abandoned as unnecessary.

A rifleman was expected to be able to fire two aimed shots a minute, compared to the three shots a minute for the Brown Bess musket in the hands of a trained infantryman. The average time to reload a rifle is dependent on the level of training and experience of the user, with twenty seconds (or three shots a minute) being possible for a highly proficient rifleman. Using a hand-measured powder charge for accurate long-range shots could increase the load time to as much as a minute.

Accuracy was of more importance than the rate of fire when skirmishing. The rifleman's primary battlefield role was to utilize cover and skirmish (frequently against enemy skirmishers), whereas his musket-armed counterparts in the line infantry fired in volley or mass-fire. This could further reduce the firing rate of the rifle compared to the musket during battle.

Troops issued with the Baker rifle were also occasionally required to "stand in the line" and serve as regular infantry if the situation called for it. The higher rate of fire (and therefore the volume of fire) of the musket was required when deployed as line infantry, even if this came with a significant loss in accuracy. For this reason, ammunition was issued in two forms: one, loose balls, in standard carbine caliber with greased patches for accurate shooting, with loose powder inside a flask equipped with a spring-loaded charger to automatically measure out the correct amount of powder; and two, paper cartridges similar to regular musket ammunition. The requirement for the Baker armed troops to be able to perform regular infantry tasks, such as form square against cavalry, or resist a bayonet attack, led to the rather cumbersome 23½-inch-long sword-bayonet which, when fitted, made the rifle-bayonet length some 65 inches, nearly the same as a bayonet-fitted musket. There were talks early in the rifle's adoption of additionally equipping the riflemen with short pikes instead of bayonets, but this impractical idea was never put into actual use.

=== Accuracy and range ===
The rifle as originally manufactured was expected to be capable of firing at a range of up to 200 yards (183 meters) with a high hit rate. The Baker rifle was used by skirmishers facing their opponents in pairs, sniping at the enemy either from positions in front of the main lines or from hidden positions in heights overlooking battlefields.

The accuracy of the rifle in capable hands is most famously demonstrated at the Battle of Cacabelos (during Moore's retreat to Corunna in 1809) by the action of Rifleman Thomas Plunkett (or Plunket) of the 1st Battalion, 95th Rifles, who shot French General Colbert at an unknown but long range (as much as 600 yards (550 m) according to some sources). He then shot Colbert's aide-de-camp, Latour-Maubourg, who went to the aid of his general, suggesting that the success of the first shot was not due to luck.

That rifleman Plunkett and others were able to regularly hit targets at ranges considered to be beyond the rifle's effective range speaks for both their marksmanship and the capabilities of the rifle.

== See also ==
- British military rifles
- Sharpe (novel series)
- Death to the French
