= William Green (British Army soldier) =

English rifleman (1784–1881)

- Born: 7 June 1784; Lutterworth, Leicestershire, England
- Died: 27 January 1881 (aged 96); Leicester, England
- Burial place: Welford Road Cemetery, Leicester; 52°37′16″N 1°07′40″W
- Military career
- Allegiance: United Kingdom
- Branch: British Army
- Service years: 1803–1812
- Rank: Rifleman-Bugler
- Units: Leicestershire Militia; 95th Rifles
- Conflicts: Battle of Copenhagen (1807); Peninsular War
- Awards: Military General Service Medal

William Green (7 June 1784 – 27 January 1881) was an English rifleman of the 95th Regiment who served in the Napoleonic Wars. He was the author of a memoir entitled "A brief outline of the Travels and Adventures of William Green (late Rifle Brigade) during a period of ten years in the British Service" (1857), one of the few accounts by an enlisted man of life in the army of Arthur Wellesley, 1st Duke of Wellington. As such it has served as a primary source for many historians.

== Early life ==
Green was the second child of John and Elizabeth Green, of Welford, Northamptonshire, who settled in Lutterworth just before his birth. In June 1803 Green, aged 19, and having, in his own words; "a disposition to ramble", enlisted in the Leicestershire Militia. However, "not being content in my station", on 18 April 1805 he enlisted into the 1st Battalion of the 95th Regiment of Foot at Canterbury.

== Military career ==
Having completed his training as a Rifleman, Green left England on 5 November 1805, as part of a contingent of 20,000 British troops sent to northern Germany under the command of General Donn. They landed at Cuxhaven on 19 November. This became known as the "Coffee Expedition", because there was no fighting. The Rifles returned to England in early 1806. Green then took part in another abortive expedition, this time to Sweden under the command of Sir John Moore. After being anchored for six weeks in Gothenburg harbour the Rifles returned to England without firing a shot.

In July 1807, Green and the Rifles left England for the third time to take part in the expedition against Copenhagen under the command of Lord Cathcart. They arrived on the outskirts of Copenhagen on 16 August 1807 and took part in the capture of the city. There Green had the good fortune to be billeted at the King of Denmark's country palace, which impressed him greatly.

On his return from Copenhagen, Green then took part in the expedition to Portugal. The regiment sailed from Spithead on 24 May 1808 and after suffering severe weather landed at Vimeiro on 28 August, missing the battle by seven days. After the conclusion of the armistice Lieutenant-General Sir John Moore led his forces into Spain where they were quartered in villages around Salamanca.

=== Retreat to Coruña ===
However the prompt entry of Napoleon into Madrid, at the head of large army, led to the retreat to Coruña, a distance of 250 miles over mountainous country in the depths of winter. There were no tents, little food, and the British were constantly harried by pursuing French troops.

Eventually the Rifles' commanding officer gave orders to discard knapsacks and keep either a greatcoat or blanket. Green remarks; "We did not mind parting with our kits, orders must be obeyed, so we left them by the roadside, but we then still had to carry 50 rounds of ball cartridge, 30 loose balls in our waist belts, a priming flask and horn of powder, and a rifle and sword [bayonet], the two weighing 14 pounds."

The Rifle regiment formed part of the rearguard. During the retreat, Green fell into a well and only avoided capture by the pursuing French by lying low till they had passed. The Rifles eventually arrived at Coruña on 12 January 1809.

Though most of his troops were successfully evacuated by the Royal Navy, General Moore was mortally wounded during the battle of Coruña on 16 January 1809. The next day the Rifles sailed for England. They arrived at Spithead on 3 February 1809 and were marched to Hilsea Barracks, three miles from Portsmouth. Green recounts that their uniforms were so ragged and verminous that they were burnt in Barrack Square.

=== Spain under Wellington ===
After a brief respite at Hythe Barracks, on 24 May 1809 the Rifles, with a new intake from the militia, sailed from Dover to Lisbon, where General Arthur Wellesley was now in command. From there they famously marched 250 miles in six days, but arrived one day too late to take part in the battle of Talavera.

The British were then obliged to retreat to Portugal before Marshal Soult. In September 1810 a French army led by Marshall Massena advanced against the British, leading to the battle of Busaco. Green by this time had learned to play, and been made a company bugler. Green and the Rifles spent the next year behind the Lines of Torres Vedras.

In late 1811 the British left the Lines and advanced once more into Spain. On 20 January 1812 the citadel of Ciudad Rodrigo was stormed. Then it was on to the fortified town of Badajoz. On 6 April 1812, during the storming of the city, Green was badly wounded by a musket ball in the groin and another through his left wrist. Even so, hearing the Bugle-Major sound the advance and the double-quick, Green lay on his back and repeated the signal – the last time he blew a bugle.

=== Return to England ===
After four days, he along with the other wounded were taken to the Convent of Elvas. On 17 April he set sail from Lisbon, arriving at Portsmouth on 3 August 1812. There at Haslar Hospital, he was treated by Dr. James Moore (the brother of the General) who removed twenty-nine bone splinters from his arm (though he carried part of the musket ball there for the rest of his life). In September, Green and the other walking wounded were marched to Chelsea Hospital in London. There on 9 December 1812 Green was awarded a pension of 9d a day. As his share of the prize money for the capture of Copenhagen he received £3 16s 2d.

== Later life ==
Green returned to Lutterworth, and married Elizabeth Laughton in September 1813. They had five children. In 1816 Green was examined by the Nottingham Medical Board and found unfit to serve. Green was examined again in 1819 by the Newark Medical Board, and once more found unfit. He then applied for, and was awarded, £15 from the Royal Patriotic Fund for his wounds, which were considered equal to the loss of a limb.

In 1849 Green was awarded the Military General Service Medal with four clasps representing Coruña, Busaco, Ciudad Rodrigo and Badajoz.

When the Duke of Wellington died in September 1852, Colonel Shirley, formerly of the 7th Hussars, who lived at Lutterworth, paid Green's expenses to travel to London to attend the funeral. Whilst there Green visited Chelsea Hospital. In January 1853 his pension was increased to 1 shilling a day for life.

In June 1853 he married for the second time (his first wife having died in 1848). He and Alice Pebody, a widow, were married at the Baptist Church, Rugby, and settled in her cottage in South Kilworth, where he wrote his memoir. In 1857, the Rector of South Kilworth wrote on Green's behalf to Albert, Prince Consort, enclosing a copy. The Prince responded with a letter and £5 to be given to "this evidently deserving old soldier". A copy was also sent to the Prince of Wales through the Mayor of Leicester. The Prince's secretary responded and sent a cheque for £3. A copy was also sent to the Duke of Cambridge who sent £1.

By 1871 Green and his wife had moved to Leicester to live nearer to her daughter. In 1877 Green was a special guest at a banquet to honour local veterans. It was held at Leicester Corn Exchange on Inkerman Day, 5 November. The banquet was funded by subscriptions from the Prince of Wales, the Duke of Cambridge and the Duke of Rutland, as well as many local dignitaries. The veterans assembled at the Magazine Barracks at 4 pm. Then, to the strains of the Drum and Fife Band of the Grenadiers, they marched to the Corn Exchange for a feast of venison, game, and plum pudding. Mr. Crofts of Cosby, the oldest naval veteran, aged 80, and William Green, now 93, were carried shoulder high to respond to the toast for their respective branches of the service.

Green died of old age in Leicester on 27 January 1881, aged 96. He was buried with full Military Honours in Welford Road Cemetery.

== Sources ==
- "Where Duty Calls Me" – The Experiences of William Green of Lutterworth in the Napoleonic Wars. Edited by John and Dorothea Teague, and based on William Green's own book "Travels and Adventures of William Green (late Rifle Brigade)", Synjon Books, 1975.
- William Green, Sheila Mileham, Leicestershire & Rutland Family History Society Journal No. 109, September 2002.

== See also ==
- Rifleman Harris
