= Thomas Plunket =

Irish soldier (1785–1839)

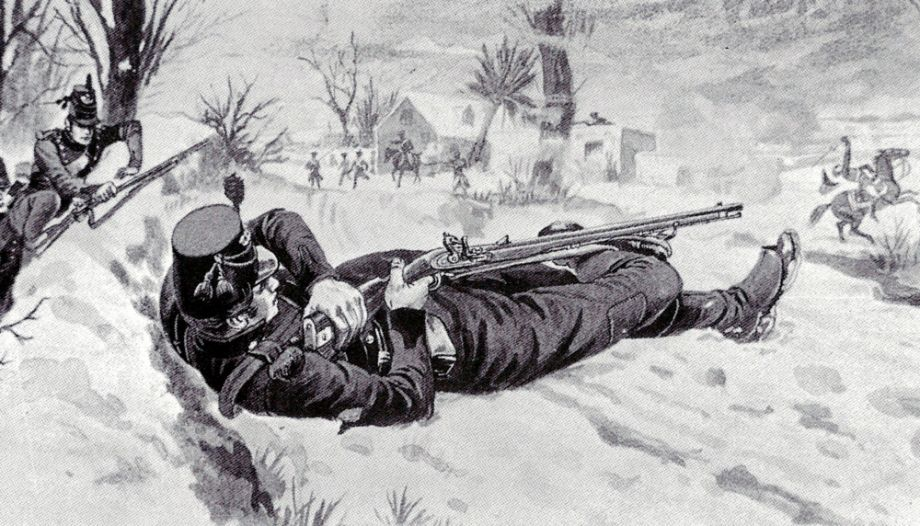
- Plunket (centre) shooting Auguste François-Marie de Colbert-Chabanais (right)
- Born: 1785; Newtown, County Wexford
- Died: 1839 (aged 53–54); Colchester, Essex
- Military career
- Allegiance: United Kingdom
- Branch: British Army
- Service years: 1805–1817
- Rank: Corporal
- Units: 95th Rifles; 41st Regiment of Foot
- Conflicts: Anglo-Spanish War (1796–1808); British invasions of the River Plate; Peninsular War; Battle of Cacabelos; War of the Seventh Coalition; Waterloo campaign; Battle of Waterloo

Corporal Thomas Plunket (1785 – 1839) was an Irish soldier who served in the British Army during the Napoleonic Wars. Serving as a rifleman in the 95th Rifles, he fought in the British invasions of the River Plate, Peninsular War and Waterloo campaign. Plunket is best known for killing French Brigade-general Auguste François-Marie de Colbert-Chabanais at the Battle of Cacabelos at a long distance with his Baker rifle.

== Early life ==
Thomas Plunket was born in 1785 in Newtown in County Wexford. He enlisted the British Army's 95th Regiment of Foot (Rifles) at the rank of private in May 1805 and was sent to South America in 1807 to participate in the British invasions of the River Plate. During an engagement with Spanish colonial forces in Buenos Aires, Plunket killed approximately 20 Spanish soldiers while sniping from a rooftop alongside other members of his unit, before retreating when Spanish artillery attacked their position with grapeshot. Plunket also shot and killed a Spanish officer waving a white handkerchief who was possibly attempting to arrange a truce, which resulted in more Spanish artillery bombardments, ultimately contributing to the British surrender and the end of the invasions.

== Peninsular War ==
In 1808, Plunket was sent to the Iberian Peninsula to fight against French forces as part of the Peninsular War. Landing in Portugal, he was part of a British army under Lieutenant-General John Moore which advanced into Spain in late 1808. However, as Napoleon personally arrived to command French forces in the conflict, Moore's army was forced to withdraw from Spain and conducted a fighting retreat to Corunna in early 1809.

During the Battle of Cacabelos on 3 January 1809, Plunket ran forward from the British line about 90 metres (100 yd), lay down in a supine position in the snow, and killed French Brigadier-General Auguste François-Marie de Colbert-Chabanais with his Baker rifle. He quickly reloaded and killed Colbert-Chabanais' aide-de-camp, Latour-Maubourg, who had rushed to the aid of Colbert-Chabanais, demonstrating that the first shot had not been a fluke. Plunket only just made it back to the British line, avoiding a dozen charging French cavalrymen, but the deaths of the two officers were sufficient to throw the French attack into disarray.

The distance of the shots has been debated by historians. The shots were deemed "extraordinary" by the men of the 95th Rifles, who were trained to shoot targets with a Baker Rifle at 180 metres (200 yd). Their marksmanship was far better than the ordinary British soldiers, who were armed with a Brown Bess musket and only trained to shoot into a body of men at 50 metres (55 yd) with volley fire. The 95th Rifles trained for long distance sniping, and Plunket was among the unit's top marksmen. Most historians agree the range was at least 100 yards, with a likelihood of around 200-300 yards, with Plunket possibly advancing slightly between shots. A historian familiar with the area asserts it was no less than 200 yards, a remarkable feat given the Baker rifle's limitations and the moving target.

== Later life ==
Plunket continued to serve in the British army and eventually fought in the Waterloo campaign of 1815, where he was wounded in the head by French forces at the Battle of Waterloo. Discharged after the battle, Plunket was a given a pension of merely six pennies per day, which led him to enlist back into the British Army in the 41st Regiment of Foot. The regiment was being inspected by his former commanding officer, Major-General Sir Thomas Sydney Beckwith, when Beckwith recognised Plunket and inquired into what had happened to him. He was invited to the officers' mess that night and the next day was promoted to corporal, and quickly had his pension raised to one shilling a day due to Beckwith's influence.

Plunket eventually renounced his pension in exchange for four years' pay and land in the Canadas, but returned to England after a year, considering the land awarded to him unsuitable for farming. Plunket and his wife, nearly destitute, made a small living as itinerant traders. He died suddenly at Colchester, Essex in 1839. Several retired officers in the town heard about his death and recognized him; as a result, they took up a collection for his widow and paid for his funeral and gravestone.
