= Bert Harris =

English cyclist (1873–1897)

Personal information
- Full name: Albert Walter Allen Harris
- Nickname: Bert
- Born: 9 April 1873 Birmingham, England
- Died: 21 April 1897 (aged 24) Birmingham, England

Cycling career
- Sport: Cycling
- Discipline: Track
- Role: Rider
- Rider type: Sprinter

Amateur team
- 1887–1893: –

Professional team
- 1894–1897: London Polytechnic Cycle Club

Major wins
- Professional Champion

Albert Walter Allen Harris (9 April 1873 in Birmingham – 21 April 1897 in Birmingham General Hospital) was a professional racing cyclist. He was raised in Leicester and attended Holy Trinity School. He started cycling competitively at the age of 14 and came second in the 'Infirmary Sports' at Aylestone Road Sports Ground (now the Grace Road Cricket Ground) two years later.

== Early life ==
Harris was born in Birmingham on 9 April 1873, the son of Walter James and Emma Harris.

== Cyclist ==
Harris gained his first major win at Bristol in 1889, completing the Five Mile race in 18 minutes and 25 seconds. Harris broke the records for the mile and three-quarter mile events in 1893 before turning professional in 1894 and joined the London Polytechnic Cycle Club. Harris was coached by Sam Mussabini to his first professional cycling championship victory in 1894. During a race in Cardiff in April 1895, he came off his bicycle and was knocked unconscious for 48 hours. However, by September he was well enough to break the English professional record at Herne Hill Velodrome, completing the half-mile in 57.3 seconds and the mile in 118.3 seconds.

Harris competed alongside the big names in cycling in Australia during the southern summer of 1895-1896, receiving £400 for winning one race alone. On average he earned £15 a week. He was so successful that people began to refer to 1896 as Harris Year.

== Death ==
Harris' last event was a ten-mile race on Easter Monday in 1897. About four miles into the race he came off his bicycle after a wheel buckled and struck his head on the hard surface. He died two days later without regaining consciousness.

His funeral was held on 26 April which included a cortege from his home at Portsmouth Road in the Belgrave district of Leicester to the Welford Road cemetery two miles away. The Leicester Chronicle reported it as "Such a scene at a funeral has never been equalled in Leicester" with crowds of people ("tens of thousands") turned out along the route. As the cortege arrived at Welford Road it was joined by representative gathering of cyclists and athletes from the midlands area.

== Harris' remembrance ==
A memorial erected at Welford Road Cemetery, Leicester is evidence of popularity:

"This memorial stone is erected by the cyclists of England
in token of the sincere respect
and esteem in
which he was held by wheelmen
the world over.
He was ever a fair and honourable rider
and sportsman and his lamented death cut
off in its prime one of the brightest and
most genial spirits of cycledom.
He fell on the racing path at Aston on
Easter Monday 1897 and succumbed to
his injuries at the General Hospital
Birmingham April 21, 1897 aged 24 years."

Dick Swann wrote a book titled Bert Harris of the Poly: A Cycling Legend which was published by V Harvey in January 1974. ISBN 978-0-85544-010-7

Roger Lovell, a Leicester businessman is hoping to raise £30,000 in order to erect a public statue to commemorate Harris. Lovell also approached the BBC to film a drama documentary, which was subsequently made by Victorian reconstructionists on location in Leicester. In a bizarre coincidence, the actor who played Harris turned out to be his descendant.
