= Auguste François-Marie de Colbert-Chabanais =

French Army officer (1777–1809)

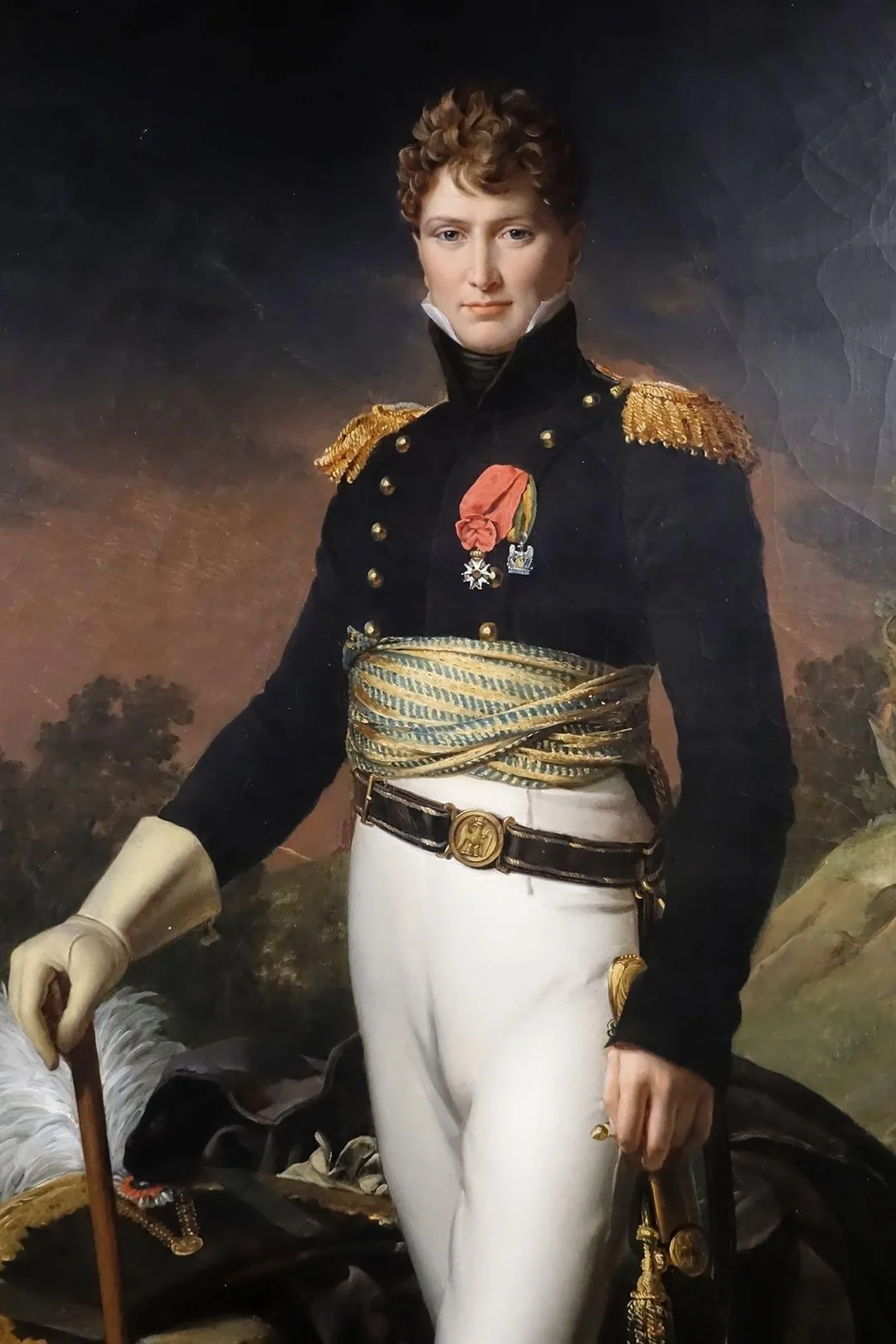
- Portrait by François Gérard, 1809
- Born: 18 October 1777; Paris, France
- Died: 3 January 1809 (aged 31); Cacabelos, Spain
- Military career
- Allegiance: French First Republic; First French Empire
- Branch: French Revolutionary Army; French Imperial Army
- Service years: 1795–1809
- Rank: Brigade general
- Conflicts: French Revolutionary Wars; French invasion of Egypt and Syria; Napoleonic Wars; Peninsular War; Battle of Cacabelos †
- Awards: Comte de l'Empire

Brigade-General Auguste François-Marie de Colbert-Chabanais (French: [oɡyst fʁɑ̃swa maʁi də kɔlbɛʁ ʃabanɛ]; 18 October 1777 – 3 January 1809) was a French Army officer who served in the French Revolutionary and Napoleonic Wars. He became a general officer of cavalry during the Napoleonic Wars and fought in several major battles under Emperor Napoleon from 1805 to 1807. He was killed by a long-range shot fired by the British Army soldier Thomas Plunket at the Battle of Cacabelos in 1809.

== Early career ==
Colbert enlisted the French Revolutionary Army as a private, but soon became aide-de-camp to Emmanuel Grouchy, then to Joachim Murat and served in the Army of Italy. During the Egyptian campaign, he took part in the Saléhieh affair and the Siege of Acre, receiving a serious wound in the latter action. He returned to France with Louis Desaix then went to Italy, where he behaved with distinction at the Battle of Marengo on 14 June 1800. His actions merited the star of the Légion d'honneur, granted him on 11 December 1803, and on 25 December 1804, he was made a colonel of the 10th Chasseurs à cheval Regiment.

== Napoleonic Wars ==
Colbert distinguished himself at the Battle of Elchingen on 14 October 1805. During the combat, he led the 3rd Hussar and 10th Chasseur Regiments in support of Marshal Michel Ney's attacking infantry. He also fought at the Battle of Austerlitz in December. Promoted to brigade general at the end of 1805, he was given an important mission to St Petersburg by Napoleon, where he was accompanied by his great friend Claude Testot-Ferry, later a colonel in the cavalry of the Imperial Guard. He and Ferry met again in Spain. He married the daughter of senator Canclaux, and they had two sons in 1805 and 1808.

On 14 October 1806, while commanding the cavalry of Ney's VI Corps, Colbert served at the Battle of Jena, leading several charges of the 3rd Hussar and 10th Chasseur Regiments against enemy infantry. Still with VI Corps, he led his troopers at the Battle of Eylau on 8 February 1807 and the Battle of Friedland on 14 June. At this period Ney said of him, "I sleep peacefully when Colbert commands my outposts." Sent to Spain in 1808 to join the Peninsular War, Colbert fought at the Battle of Medina del Rioseco on 14 July 1808 while serving under Marshal Jean-Baptiste Bessières. On 23 November, he led his cavalry at the Battle of Tudela under Marshal Jean Lannes. That winter, he commanded the 3rd Hussars and 15th Chasseurs in the cavalry advance guard of Marshal Nicolas Soult, who was pursuing Sir John Moore's British army in its retreat to A Coruña.

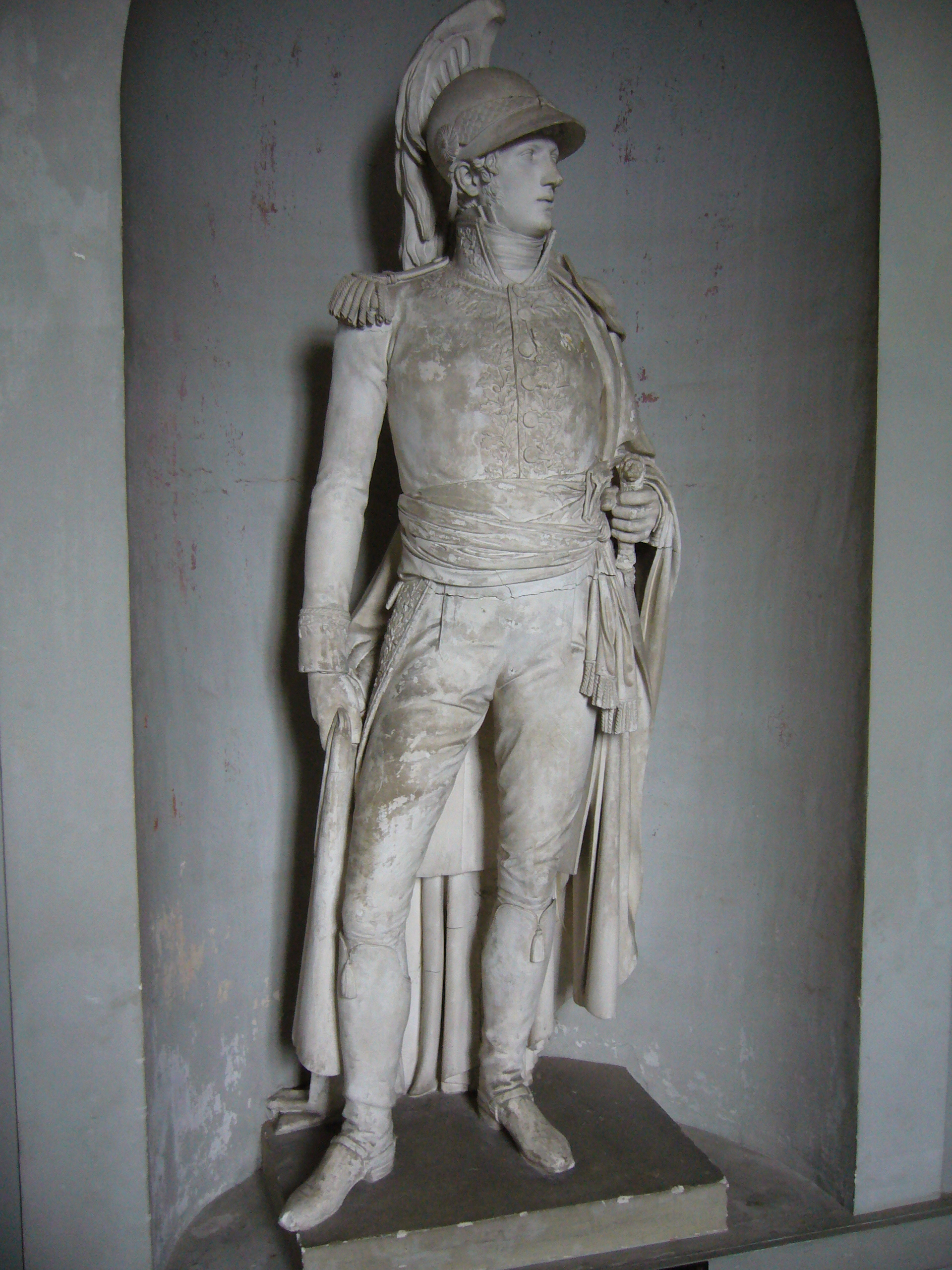
Statue of Colbert

On the Astorga road not far from Villafranca, Colbert's troopers captured 2,000 prisoners and wagon trains carrying rifles, as well as releasing some French troops captured by the British. Later the same day, however, at the Battle of Cacabelos, Irish Rifleman Thomas Plunket, a noted sharpshooter in the 95th Rifles, one of the British units still under effective military discipline, advanced alone towards the French. Plunket killed Colbert with a single long-range rifle shot, then killed an officer who came to Colbert's assistance with a second shot. These shots were likely taken beyond the normal rifle range of 200–300 meters, and well beyond the musket range of 80 meters, so Colbert would not have considered himself close enough to the British rearguard to be in any danger.

When Ney learned of his death, he sent an aide to collect his personal effects. He wrote, "His wife and child will one day attach value to having what belonged to him. Besides it is the only and final proof of friendship that I could give to this brave young man." By a decree of 1 January 1810, Napoleon decided that a statue of Colbert should be placed on the pont de la Concorde, though this project never came to fruition. The name COLBERT is engraved on Column 38 on the west face of the Arc de Triomphe.
