= Welford Road Cemetery =

Public cemetery in Leicester, England

Coordinates: 52.621102°N 1.127699°W

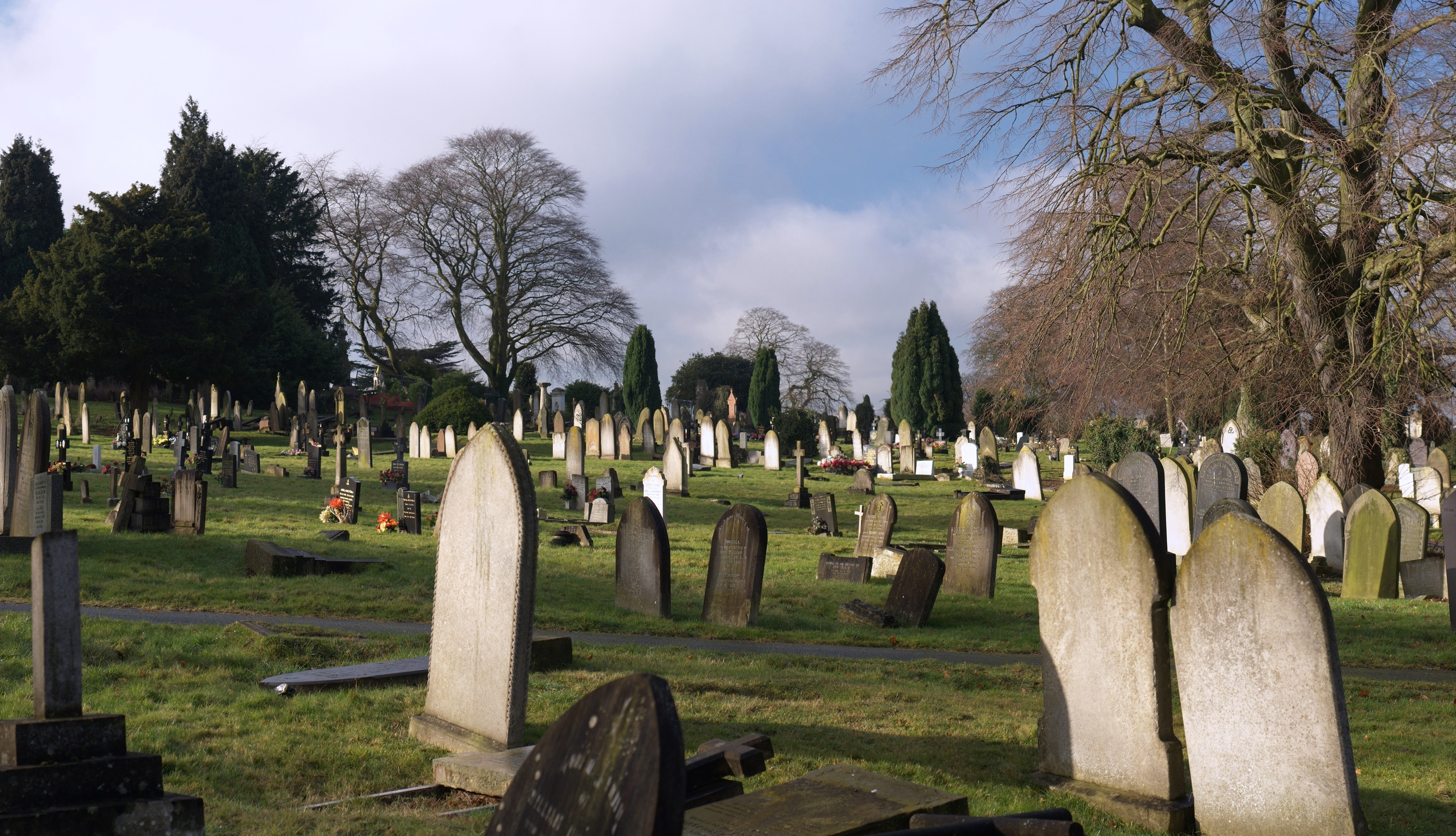
Welford Road Cemetery

Welford Road Cemetery is a public cemetery in Leicester, England.

== History ==
The Leicester General Cemetery Company was founded in 1845, and the cemetery itself opened in 1849. The buildings and plan of the cemetery were designed by J. R. Hamilton and J. M. Medland, who also designed cemeteries for Birmingham and Plymouth. Welford Road Cemetery was initially intended for dissenters, but the local Anglican community was able to gain inclusion. The site was initially 17 acres (6.9 ha) in size, but was extended by 13 acres (5.3 ha) in 1894.

The original parts of the cemetery were built to a symmetrical plan. Two adjacent chapels were built, serving both Anglicans and non-Anglicans. Similarly, the original cemetery contained roughly equal areas of consecrated and unconsecrated ground.

The two chapels have now been demolished, as has a gothic lodge near the main entrance. The gardener's lodge survives as the University of Leicester chaplaincy, and the ornate 1895 entrance gates are still in place. A modern visitor's centre is located near the cemetery's main entrance.

== War graves ==
The cemetery contains over 300 British Commonwealth war graves, cared for by the Commonwealth War Graves Commission (CWGC), 286 from the First World War (more than half of these in a war graves plot where a Screen Wall memorial lists names of those buried in it) and 46 from the Second, beside graves of 8 Belgian servicemen (one unidentified). It also has a war memorial which includes a statue designed by Sir Reginald Blomfield.

== Notable burials ==
The dense collection of monuments in front of where the two chapels once stood demonstrates the symmetrical layout of the cemetery: the area on the left is unconsecrated ground for non-conformists, while the area on the right is consecrated ground for Anglicans.

A leaflet published by Leicester City Council identifies one hundred notable burials within the cemetery. The cemetery itself contains a large number of commemorative plaques, giving biographical information about notable interments.

- Ewart Astill – cricketer, playing for Leicestershire County Cricket Club
- Thomas Cook – early travel agent and founder of the Thomas Cook Group
- John Flower (artist) (1793–1861)
- William Green – soldier in the Napoleonic Wars
- Bert Harris – professional cyclist
- Arthur Wakerley – architect

== Controversy ==
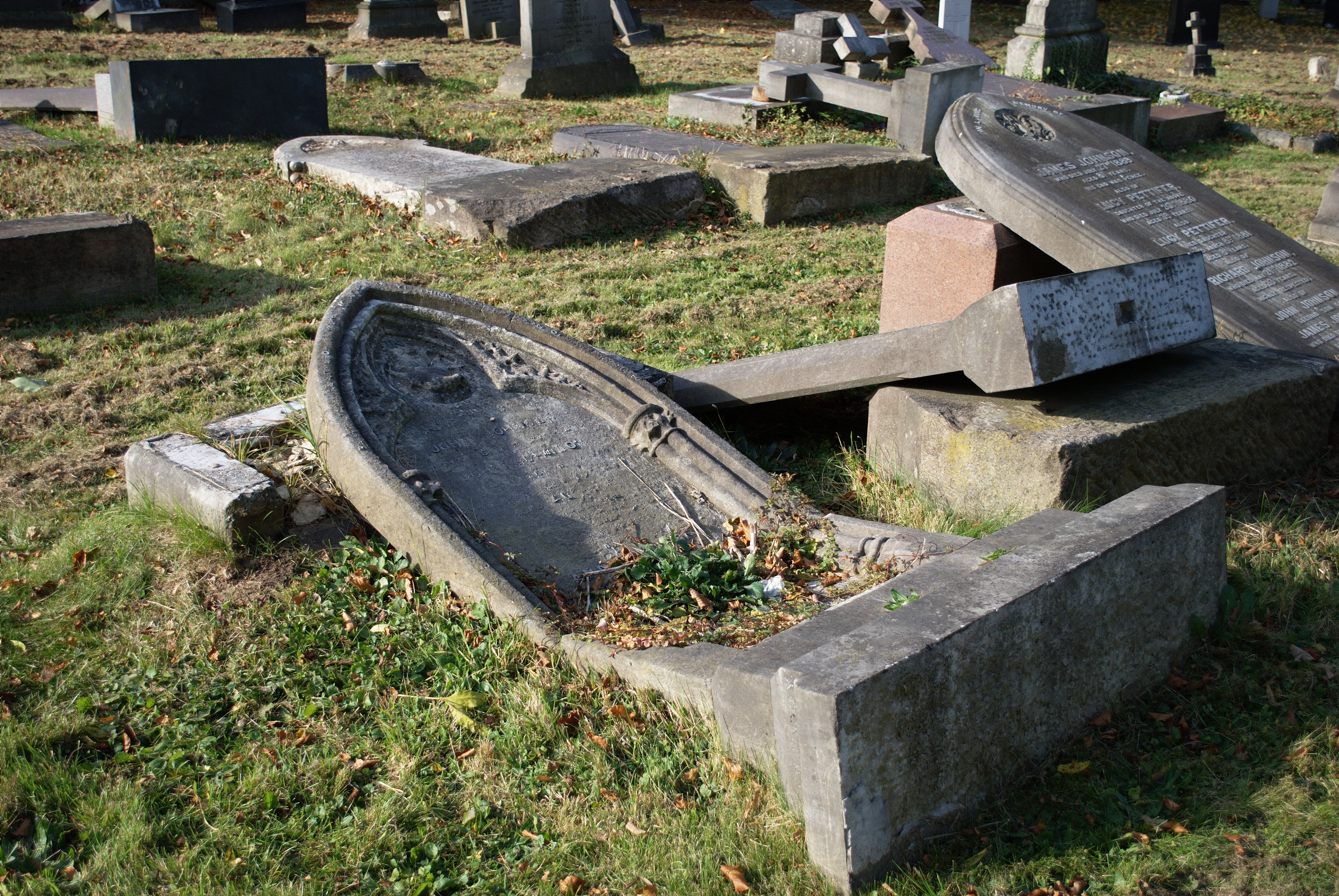
Flattened and damaged gravestones in Welford Road Cemetery

Between 2002 and 2004 about 1000 memorials and headstones were laid flat after Leicester City Council 'topple-tested' them for stability. Initially unaware that they needed to obtain a faculty to authorise this in the consecrated ground, the council applied for a faculty retrospectively, although they were opposed in this by relatives of 119 Polish descendants whose relatives' memorials had been laid flat. At first the Consistory Court rejected the Council's application, but this was subsequently granted on appeal to the Court of Arches in 2006. However, in granting the faculty the Court required the Council to work with the Friends of Welford Road Cemetery and members of the local Polish community to restore those flattened memorials.
