= Battle of Cacabelos =

1809 battle of the Peninsular War

- Part of the Peninsular War
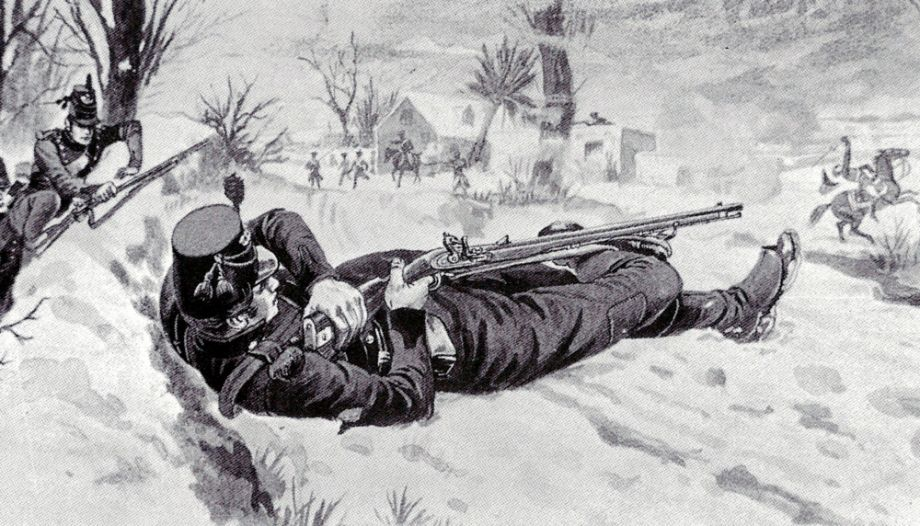
- Thomas Plunket killing Auguste François-Marie de Colbert-Chabanais during the battle
Date	3 January 1809
Location	León, Spain 42°36′N 6°43′W
Territorial changes	British withdrawal from Cacabelos to La Coruña

Belligerents
France	United Kingdom

Commanders and leaders
Auguste François-Marie de Colbert-Chabanais †	Edward Paget

Casualties and losses
200 killed or wounded	200 killed or wounded 50 captured

Peninsular War: Napoleon's invasion
current battle

The Battle of Cacabelos was fought on 3 January 1809 during the Peninsular War at the bridge just outside the village of Cacabelos, Province of León, Spain, as British forces under Sir John Moore making their retreat to A Coruña. In the ensuing engagement with French Marshal Jean-de-Dieu Soult's advance guard, British units were overwhelmed and forced to mount a hurried withdrawal across the bridge. Ultimately, however, the French forces failed to press their advance further due to heavy losses including the death of French Brigadier General Colbert-Chabanais. The resulting delay allowed Moore's forces to continue their retreat while keeping their forces largely intact.

== Background ==
The Corunna campaign started with the Battle of Cardedeu. The village, on a plain in the mountainous region 15 kilometres (9.3 miles) past Ponferrada on the road from Astorga to A Coruña, is in the line of retreat taken by Moore's army to A Coruña, and its double arch stone bridge crosses the river Cua, a tributary of the Sil.

== Battle ==
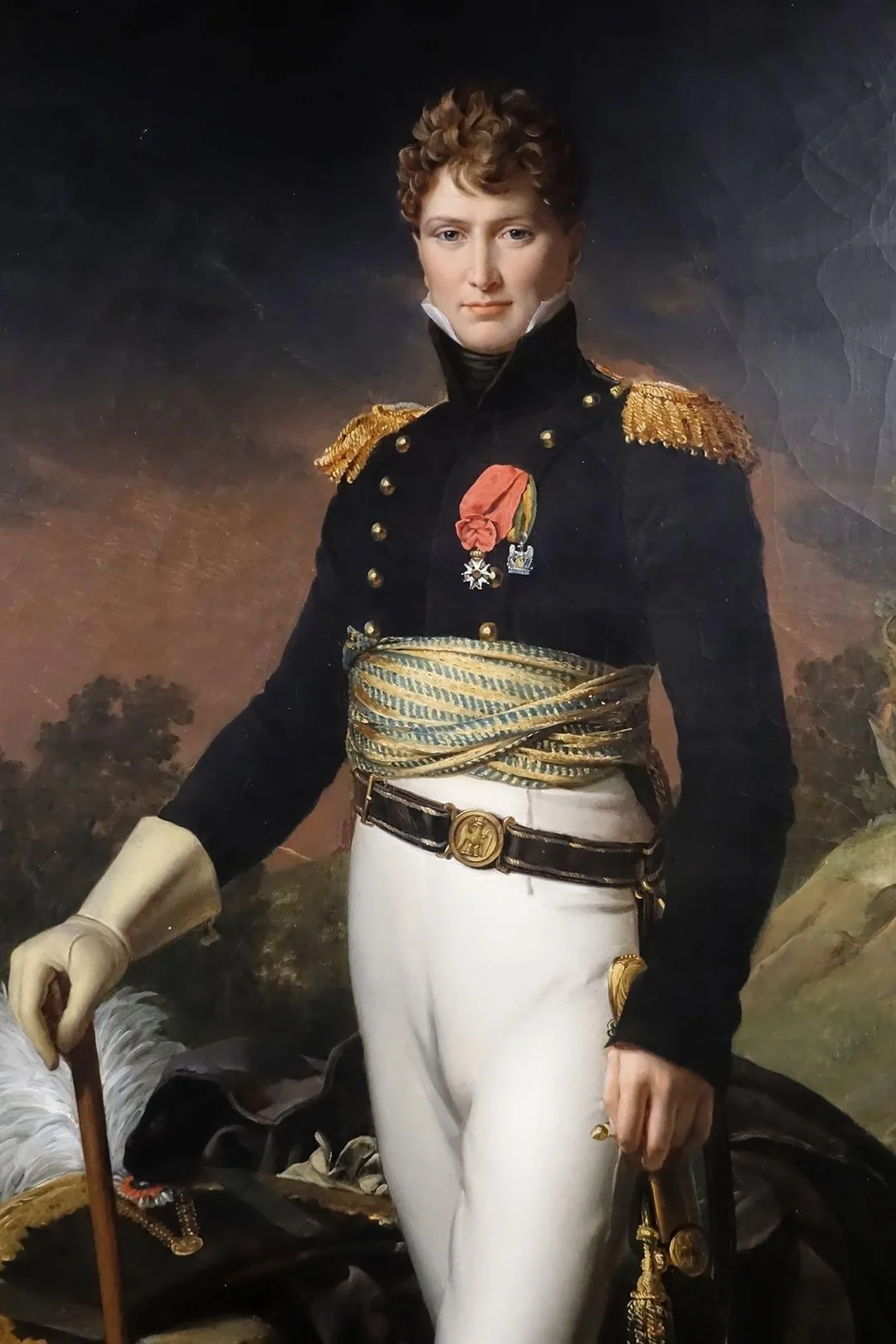
1809 portrait of Auguste François-Marie de Colbert-Chabanais

Moore, who was camped at Villafranca, half a day's march away in the direction of La Coruña, had ridden back to see Edward Paget whose elder brother Henry, Lord Paget, had led a successful cavalry clash at Benavente just a few days previously. The rearguard of Moore's troops, having arrived at Cacabelos the previous day, and delayed by the effects of rioting and the severe cold, was preparing to cross the bridge, when the 15th Hussars informed Paget that French cavalry units were rapidly approaching from Ponferrada. Soon, between 450 and 500 troopers of the 15eme Chasseurs à Cheval and 3eme Hussards, Marshal Soult's advance guard, led by Brigadier General Auguste François-Marie de Colbert-Chabanais caught up with the tail end of the army, capturing around 50 British soldiers caught by surprise.

Deciding to press his advantage, and without waiting for infantry or artillery support, Colbert prepared to attack the bridge. However, on seeing the 95th Rifles, the 28th Foot, and six guns of the Royal Horse Artillery in position on the other side of the bridge, Colbert withdrew his men to reform them in a column of fours prior to rushing the bridge. Moore, meanwhile, who had almost been captured by Colbert's men, looked on from the western hill above the road, with Paget. When the French cavalry charged across, they were forced to retreat after being decimated by British rifle fire. Among the French fatalities was Brigadier Colbert himself who reportedly was killed immediately prior to the French attack. Colbert-Chabanais was killed by a single long-range shot from a Baker rifle, fired by a noted sharpshooter of the 95th Rifles, rifleman Thomas Plunket, and who also, with a second shot, killed the officer who came to Colbert's assistance. Although there is much discrepancy regarding the distances involved, the shot has been claimed to have been as far as 600 metres,(first published in 1841 as The Adventures of a Soldier). Costello served with Plunkett and can both cite personally witnessed experiences and the legend he already was at the time. It's highly likely that Colbert considered himself well beyond the musket range of 80 metres and therefore safe, whereas the Baker had verified target accuracy of 200 metres.

When La Houssaye's cavalry and infantry support arrived they tried to cross the river by a ford a short distance downstream from the bridge and Merle’s infantry division tried to take the bridge "a la baionette". However, by around 4.00pm, it was too dark to continue and the French, possibly considering the British defensive position too good, and also possibly low in morale due to the death of Colbert, desisted. At about 10.00pm, Paget was able to set off towards Villafranca with no sign of French troops in pursuit.

== Aftermath ==
Although British troops were able to gain time in their retreat towards La Coruña, Moore has since been criticised for being too hasty in his retreat and for not having made better use of strong defensive positions such as the one at Cacabelos. The Corunna campaign proceeded with the Battle of Corunna.

== See also ==
- Timeline of the Peninsular War

== Bibliography ==
- Costello, Edward (1841). Rifleman Costello. Lightning Source Incorporated. ISBN 1-84677-000-9.
- Esdaile, Charles J. (2003). The Peninsular War. Palgrave MacMillan. ISBN 9781403962317.
- hadaway, Stuart (2000). "The Peninsular War". Archived from the original on 16 April 2021.
- Moore, Richard (2013). "Plunket's Shot: A reconstruction of a famous exploit in the history of the 95th Rifles".
- Rickard, J. (2008). "Action at the Cacabellos Defile, 3 January 1809". Archived from the original on 10 November 2020.
