= Ralph Bunbury =

Lieutenant Ralph Bunbury (died 15 August 1808), of the 95th Rifles, is known for having been the first British Army officer casualty in the Peninsular War.

Bunbury was killed at Óbidos, Portugal.
