= Cacabelos =

- Flag Coat of arms

- Location within Spain
- Coordinates: 42°35′59″N 6°43′32″W
- Country: Spain
- Autonomous community: Castile and León
- Province: León
- Comarca: El Bierzo
- Municipality: Cacabelos

Government
  - Mayor: Irene González López (PSOE)

Area
  - Total: 32.66 km^{2} (12.61 sq mi)
- Elevation: 479 m (1,572 ft)

Population (2025-01-01)
  - Total: 4,734
  - Density: 144.9/km^{2} (375.4/sq mi)
- Demonym: cacabelense
- Time zone: UTC+1 (CET)
  - Summer (DST): UTC+2 (CEST)
- Postal Code: 24540
- Telephone prefix: 987
- Climate: Csb
- Website: Ayto. de Cacabelos

Cacabelos (Spanish pronunciation: [kakaˈβelos]) (Cacabiellos in Leonese language) is a village and municipality located in the region of El Bierzo (province of León, Castile and León, Spain). According to the 2025 census (INE), Cacabelos has a population of 4,734 inhabitants. It is well known for its wines.

== Climate ==
The climate of this area of Lower El Bierzo is characterized by a mild average annual temperature of around 12 °C. Winters are cold and often foggy, while summers are mild, although days with very high temperatures are not uncommon. Precipitation, occurring once or twice a year in the form of snow, is relatively abundant but unevenly distributed: the annual average exceeds 645 mm, with winter and spring being the wettest seasons.

== History ==
During the Peninsular War, the village, and more especially, its bridge over the river Cua, was in the line of retreat taken by Sir John Moore's British army to A Coruña, and was the site of the Battle of Cacabelos (3 January 1809), a minor battle.
