= Rifle Brigade (The Prince Consort's Own) =

Rifle regiment of the British Army

- 1927 regimental cap badge
- Active: 1800–1966
- Country: Great Britain; United Kingdom
- Branch: British Army
- Type: Infantry
- Role: Light infantry
- Size: 1–28 battalions
- Garrison/HQ: Peninsula Barracks, Winchester
- Nicknames: The Rifles; The Grasshoppers; The Sweeps; Manningham's Sharpshooters
- March: I'm Ninety-Five

The Rifle Brigade (The Prince Consort's Own) was a rifle regiment of the British Army. Raised in 1800 as the Experimental Corps of Riflemen, the regiment served in the War of the Second Coalition and was renamed the Rifle Corps in 1802. It became an established regular regiment in 1803 and was redesignated as the 95th Regiment of Foot (Rifles). The regiment served in the Napoleonic Wars before being renamed as the Rifle Brigade in 1816, subsequently serving in the Seventh Xhosa War and Crimean War.

Albert, Prince Consort was the regimental colonel-in-chief from 1852 to 1861, during which the regiment was renamed as the Prince Consort's Own Rifle Brigade. During the 1850s and 1860s the regiment participated in the suppression of the Indian Rebellion of 1857 along with being stationed in Canada. It proceeded to serve in British India, including on the North-West Frontier and in the Second Anglo-Afghan War. The regiment also fought in the Third Anglo-Ashanti War, Mahdist War and Second Boer War.

The regiment served in World War I, following which it was redesignated as the "Rifle Brigade (The Prince Consort's Own)". It subsequently served in the Irish War of Independence, World War II, Mau Mau rebellion and Malayan Emergency before being amalgamated with the other two battalions of the Green Jackets Brigade to form the Royal Green Jackets in 1966.

== History ==
=== Formation ===
Various regimental uniforms

On 17 January 1800, the Experimental Corps of Riflemen was raised by Colonel Coote Manningham and Lieutenant-colonel William Stewart, drawn from officers and other ranks from drafts of a variety of British Army regiments. The Corps differed in several regards from the line infantry of the British Army and most significantly were armed with the formidable Baker rifle. The rifle was remarkably accurate in an era when it was generally considered impractical for individual soldiers to aim at specific targets. Riflemen wore dark green jackets rather than the bright red coats of the British line infantry regiments of that time, close-fitting pantaloons rather than breeches, black facings and black belts rather than white and a green plume on their "stovepipe shakoes".

Four months after its formation, the Experimental Corps of Riflemen was judged ready for its first operation. On 25 August 1800, three regimental companies under Stewart spearheaded a British amphibious landing at Ferrol where the Rifles helped to dislodge the Spanish defenders on the heights. Despite this, the expedition was defeated and withdrew on 26 August 1800. In April 1801, one company of the Experimental Corps of Riflemen, under the command of Captain Sidney Beckwith, took part in the Battle of Copenhagen, as marksmen aboard the British warships under Vice-Admiral of the Blue Sir Horatio Nelson. During the battle, the regiment suffered one lieutenant killed, its first officer to fall, and two other ranks killed and six wounded, several of whom died of their wounds.

=== As the 95th Regiment ===
A Baker rifle, which the regiment was equipped with

In 1802, the regiment was renamed the Rifle Corps before being becoming a regular regiment of foot on the British establishment and being accordingly renamed to the 95th Regiment of Foot (Rifles). The regiment was moved to Shorncliffe Army Camp in Kent in 1803, undergoing light infantry training alongside the 43rd Foot and 52nd Foot under the tutelage of Manningham and Sir John Moore; the 52nd Foot, like the 95th Foot, would gain fame during the Peninsular War. In 1805 a second regimental battalion was raised at Canterbury and later in the year the regiment's first battalion was sent to Germany as part of the Hanover Expedition under Lord Cathcart to liberate Hanover from French occupation. The 95th subsequently formed the advance guard on the way to Bremen. In February 1806, the 95th formed the rearguard for the withdrawal to Cuxhaven and subsequently returned home to Britain.

==== South American expedition ====
In October 1806, five companies of the 1st/95th and three companies of the 2nd/95th departed for Spanish-controlled South America, Spain then being allied with France. It was part of a second invasion force that was designed as reinforcements for the first invasion against Buenos Aires, launched earlier in 1806 by Sir Home Popham without the Government's knowledge.

The 2nd/95th, as part of Brigadier-general Sir Samuel Auchmuty's force, took part in the siege and subsequent storming of Montevideo, in what is now Uruguay, and which saw Montevideo captured on 3 February 1807, after clearing the surrounding area of Spanish troops in January. The 95th subsequently saw action at Colonia against a Spanish force that had crossed from Buenos Aires; the Rifles held off the force until it could be repulsed, with the 95th gaining much praise from Auchmuty for their part in the defeat of the Spanish force. The 95th subsequently saw action in June at San Pedro where they, the 40th and light companies, fought against the Spanish force that had crossed from Buenos Aires and defeated them.

Lieutenant-general John Whitelocke, the newly arrived overall commander, subsequently launched an ill-advised and mismanaged assault on Buenos Aires in which the companies of both battalions of the 95th were involved as part of the Light Brigade, commanded by Robert Craufurd. During the assault on Buenos Aires on 5 July, the 95th and the rest of the British force suffered heavy casualties in bitter fighting to capture the city. The Light Brigade had suffered casualties so heavily that they had to take refuge in a church and were surrendered soon after Whitelocke surrendered his force. After Whitelocke negotiated the withdrawal of British forces, the men were released and they returned home later that year. The 95th would go on to fight for near the entirety of the Peninsular War in Spain. In the aftermath of the disastrous expedition, Popham and Whitelocke were court-martialed, with Popham reprimanded and Whitelocke dismissed from the Army.

==== The Baltic 1807–1808 ====
The remaining companies of the 95th were involved in the expedition to Denmark that year. They took part in the Battle of Copenhagen in 1807 as part of Arthur Wellesley's brigade. The expedition, commanded by Lord Cathcart, was intended to capture the Danish Fleet to prevent it falling into the hands of France. The expedition proved to be a thorough success with the Danish Fleet being captured at which point the British withdrew. In 1808 the 1st/95th took part in an expedition to another Scandinavian country, Sweden, an expedition that was commanded by Sir John Moore and designed to help Sweden during their war with Russia. However, once they had reached Gothenburg in May, the troops remained aboard the anchored ships for two months due to a misunderstanding between the British and Swedish governments and returned to Britain.

==== Peninsular War ====
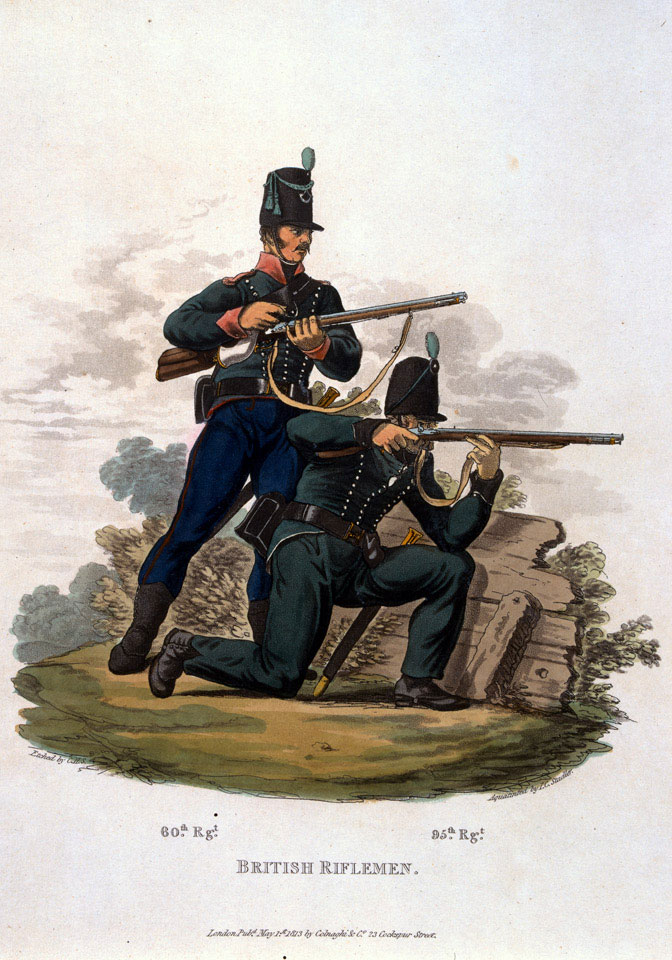
1812 engraving of a regimental private (right)

In August 1808, the 2nd/95th was part of the immediate forces sent in the Portuguese expedition initially commanded by Sir Arthur Wellesley and covered the landings at Mondego Bay (Figueira da Foz). On 15 August they had the distinction of firing the first shots of the Peninsular War during a skirmish at Óbidos against the French, but also unfortunately suffered the first British officer fatality of the war, a Lieutenant Ralph Bunbury. The 95th, as part of 6th Brigade which included the rifle armed 5th/60th Foot, took part in the Battle of Roliça, the first pitched battle of the war, on 17 August 1808. Rifleman Thomas Plunket of the 1st Battalion, 95th Rifles, shot the French General Auguste François-Marie de Colbert-Chabanais at a range of up to 800 yards (730 m) at the Battle of Cacabelos on 3 January 1809.

The 1st battalion was part of John Moore's campaign which ended with evacuation after the Battle of Corunna on 16 January 1809. The majority of the 1st battalion was rested and refitted in the UK, though a few small detachments of the 95th were stranded behind which then formed up with other detachments as part of a defence force (1st Battalion of detachments) in Portugal. The 1st returned to the peninsula a few months later in May 1809 and in July was force marched in an attempt to arrive with the main force for the Battle of Talavera but despite covering a notable distance they arrived on 29 July 1809, just after the battle.

After the depletion suffered at Corunna, the two battalions of the 95th based at Hythe in Kent were made up to a strength of 1,000 men each. However, so many volunteers came forward to join the regiment that permission was granted to raise a third battalion in 1809.

The regiment had already become so famous and popular, that not only were the deficiencies filled up in a very short time, but more than a thousand volunteers presented themselves beyond the numbers required. It was therefore resolved by the Authorities to add a 3rd Battalion to the regiment.

— Sir William Cope

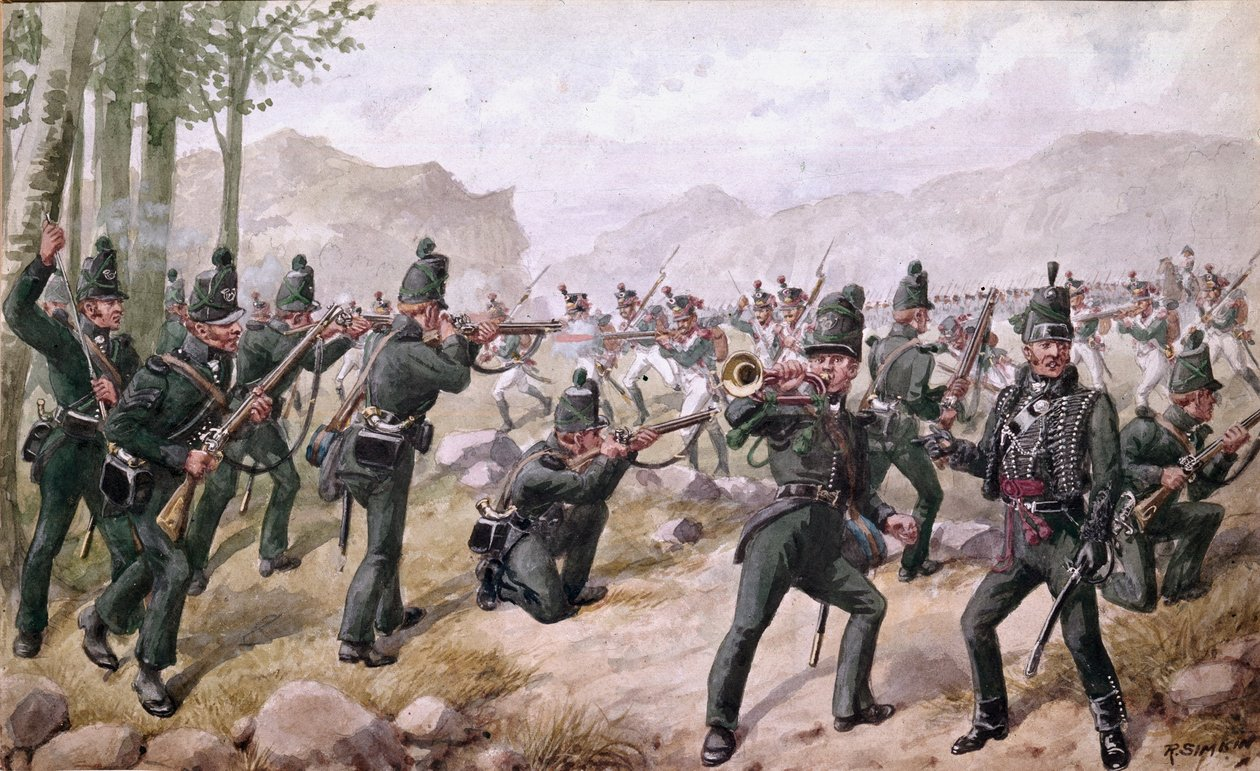
Regimental troops (foreground) at the Battle of the Pyrenees

The third battalion joined the Peninsular Army in 1810. Thereafter the three battalions of the 95th fought in numerous major battles and skirmishes during the Peninsular War as part of the elite Light Division, including the Battle of Bussaco in September 1810 and the sieges of Ciudad Rodrigo in January 1812 and Badajoz and March 1812 as well as the Battle of Vitoria in June 1813. At the Battle of San Marcial in August 1813 a company of the 95th Rifles under the command of Captain Daniel Cadoux held off an entire French division at Vera before withdrawing. The regiment also took part in the Battle of Nivelle in November 1813.

==== Waterloo campaign ====
The three battalions had been dispersed to various locations with the abdication of Napoleon and the total French defeat in 1814. The majority of the regiment's companies were sent back to England for rest and refitting while several companies had been retained in north-east France at Leuze, Aisne under General Thomas Graham. Five companies of the 3rd battalion were in North America, having been sent in late 1814 to participate in the final stages of the War of 1812. With the return of Napoleon from exile, all of the companies in England crossed the channel and landed in Belgium in May 1815, joining with those already present, so that the entire regiment, bar the five companies still in America, became part of Wellington's Anglo-Dutch army. The first battalion went on to fight at the Battle of Quatre Bras on 16 June 1815, while all three battalions would fight at the Battle of Waterloo on 18 June 1815.

=== As the Rifle Brigade ===
At the end of the Napoleonic Wars, the size of the British Army was reduced; in line with precedent the more recently formed regiments were disbanded first. The unique skills of the 95th were considered too valuable to lose so the 95th, having seen distinguished service in the Napoleonic Wars, was taken out of line of the British Army and became the "Rifle Brigade" on 23 February 1816 (the number was reassigned eight years later to the newly formed county regiment of the 95th (Derbyshire) Regiment of Foot). The Duke of Wellington became Colonel-in-Chief of the regiment in 1820 and served until his death.

==== Later nineteenth century campaigns ====
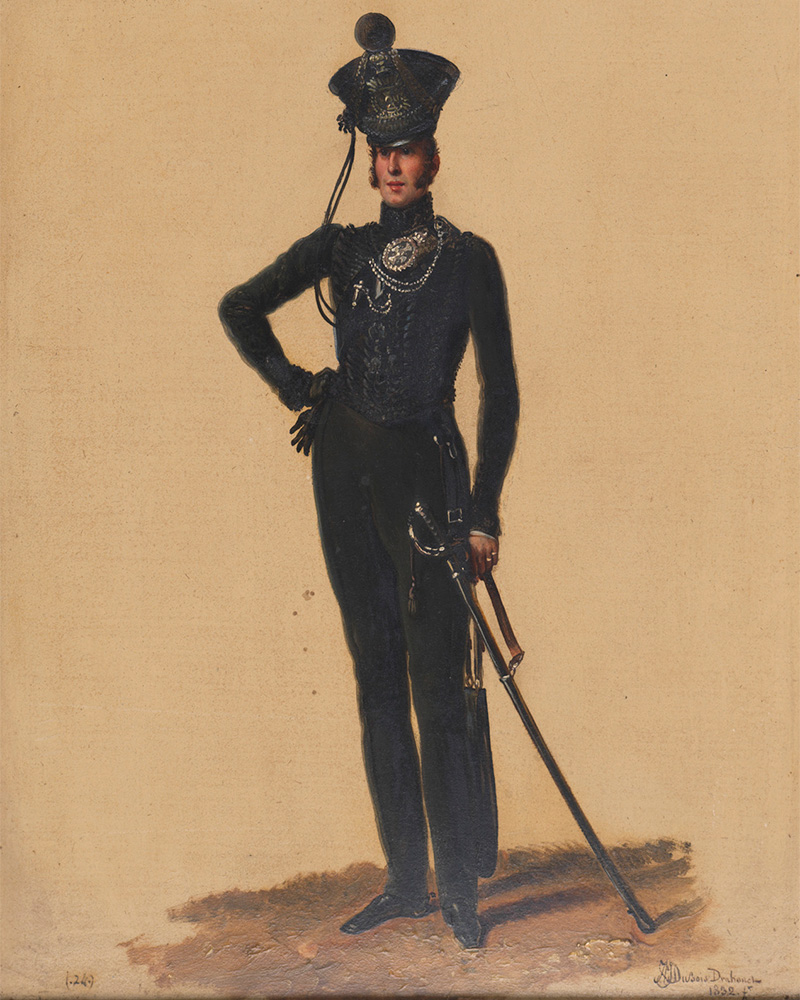
1832 portrait of a regimental major

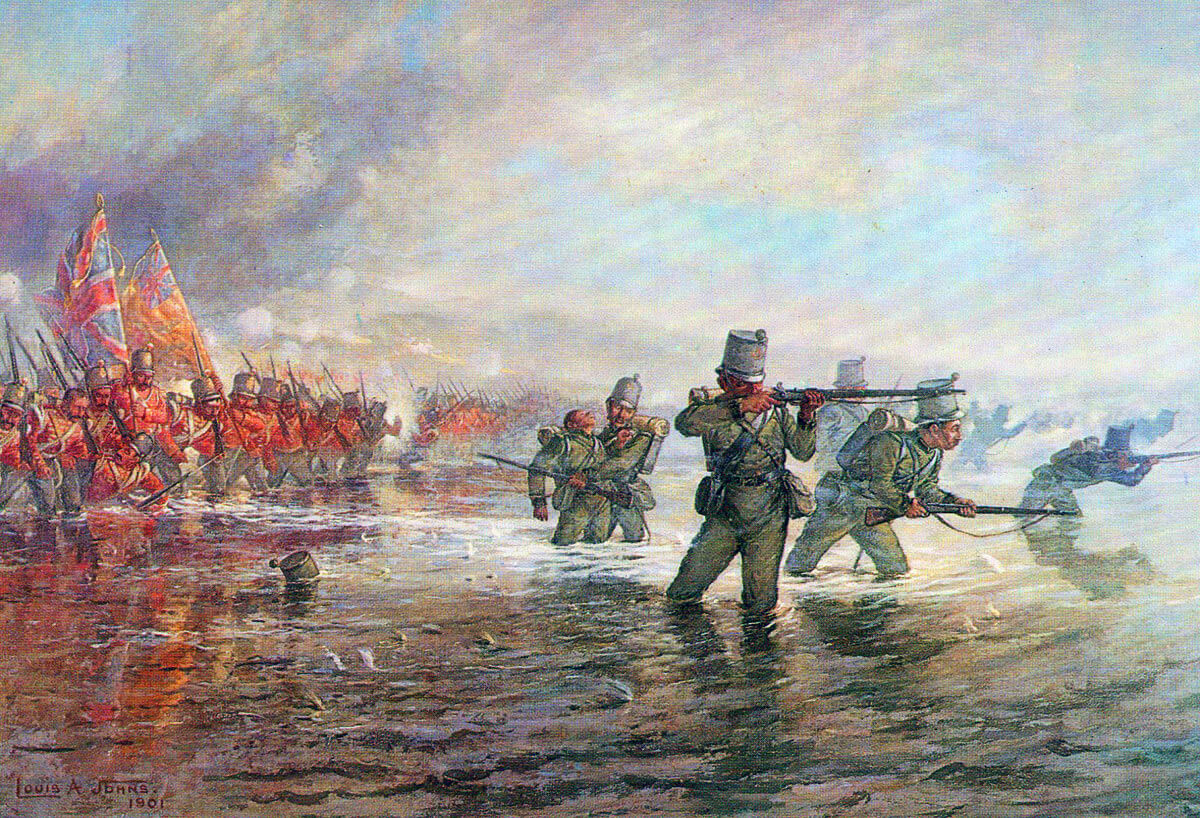
Regimental troops (right) at the Battle of the Alma

1855 watercolour of regimental troops parading in the Crimea

A regimental sergeant in c. 1895

In 1852, HRH Prince Albert, the Prince Consort took over the role of colonel-in-chief. When the Crimean War broke out in 1853 the Rifle Brigade sent two battalions which fought at the Battle of the Alma, where one of the battalions led the advance across the Alma River in September 1854. The regiment also saw action at the Battle of Inkerman in November 1854 and at the Siege of Sevastopol in winter 1854. Eight members of the regiment were awarded Victoria Crosses during the Crimean War. The regiment was deployed again as part of the Indian Rebellion and saw action at the Siege of Lucknow in autumn 1857. It was granted the title "The Prince Consort's Own Rifle Brigade" in honour of its colonel-in-chief on 17 January 1862.

In 1866, Private Timothy O'Hea of the 1st Battalion, was awarded the Victoria Cross for an act of bravery in peacetime, while his unit was stationed in the Province of Canada. On 9 June 1866, at Danville, Canada East, on the main railway between Montreal and Quebec City, a fire broke out in a car containing 2,000 pounds (910 kg) of ammunition. Despite the extreme danger, O'Hea took charge of extinguishing the fire and saved many lives.

The regiment also took part in the Battle of Ali Masjid in November 1878 during the Second Anglo-Afghan War, the Mahsud Waziri expedition in 1881, the Third Anglo-Burmese War in 1885, the Fourth Anglo-Ashanti War in 1895 and the Mahdist War in 1898.

The 1st and 2nd Battalions were both deployed to South Africa in 1899, at the outbreak of the Second Boer War (1899–1902). The 1st Battalion saw action at the Battle of Colenso in December 1899 and Battle of Vaal Krantz in February 1900. The 2nd Battalion took part in the Siege of Ladysmith in late 1899 and early 1900. Both battalions stayed in South Africa until the end of the war. 367 officers and men of the 1st battalion left Cape Town on the SS Orissa, which arrived at Southampton in late October 1902, when the battalion was stationed at Portsmouth. 990 officers and men of the 2nd battalion left Port Natal on the SS Malta in September 1902 for a new posting in Egypt. The 4th Battalion was also stationed in South Africa at some point during the war, and 900 men returned home on the SS Ortona in January 1903. The 5th, Militia Battalion, was embodied in 1900, and served in South Africa until 700 men of the battalion returned home on the SS Avondale Castle in September 1902.

In 1908, the Volunteers and Militia were reorganised nationally, with the former becoming the Territorial Force and the latter the Special Reserve; the regiment now had three Reserve but no Territorial battalions.

==== First World War ====
===== Regular army =====
The 1st Battalion landed at Le Havre as part of the 11th Brigade in the 4th Division in August 1914 for service on the Western Front. The battalion saw action at the First Battle of the Marne in September 1914, the First Battle of the Aisne in September 1914 and the Battle of Messines in October 1914 as well as the Second Battle of Ypres in April 1915, the Battle of the Somme in Autumn 1916 and the Battle of Arras in April 1917 before taking part in the Battle of Passchendaele in Autumn 1917, the Battle of the Lys in April 1918, the Advance in Flanders, the Second Battle of the Somme in August 1918, the battles of the Hindenburg Line and the Final Advance in Picardy.

The 2nd Battalion landed at Le Havre as part of the 25th Brigade in the 8th Division in November 1914 for service on the Western Front. The battalion saw action at the Battle of Neuve Chapelle in March 1915, the Battle of Aubers Ridge in May 1915 and the Battle of the Somme in Autumn 1916 as well as the advance to the Hindenburg Line, the Battle of Pilckem Ridge in August 1917 and the Battle of Passchendaele in Autumn 1917 before taking part in the Battle of St Quentin in March 1918, the Battle of Rosieres in March 1918, the Third Battle of the Aisne in May 1918, the Battle of the Scarpe in August 1918 and the Final Advance in Artois.

The 3rd Battalion landed at Saint-Nazaire as part of the 17th Brigade in the 6th Division in September 1914 for service on the Western Front. The battalion saw action at the Battle of Delville Wood in July 1916, the Battle of Guillemont in September 1916 and the Battle of Vimy Ridge in April 1917 as well as the Battle of Messines in June 1917, the Battle of Passchendaele in October 1917 and the Battle of Cambrai in November 1917 before taking part in the Second Battle of the Somme in August 1918, the Battle of Cambrai in October 1918 and the Final Advance in Picardy.

The 4th Battalion landed at Le Havre as part of the 80th Brigade in the 27th Division in December 1914 for service on the Western Front but moved to Salonika in November 1915.

===== Territorial force =====
The 18th (London) Battalion, 19th (Western) Battalion, 20th (Northern) Battalion, 21st (Midland) Battalion, 22nd (Wessex & Welsh) Battalion, 23rd (North Western) Battalion and 24th (Home Counties) Battalion were all post overseas on garrison duties in 1916.

===== New armies =====
The 7th (Service) Battalion and 8th (Service) Battalion landed at Boulogne-sur-Mer as part of the 41st Brigade in the 14th (Light) Division in May 1915 for service on the Western Front. The 8th Battalion took part in the Second Battle of Ypres, which had begun on 22 April 1915 and the action at Hooge in July 1915 where they saw the first use of flamethrowers by the Germans. Second Lieutenant Sidney Woodroffe, of the 8th Battalion, was awarded the Victoria Cross for his actions in this battle. The battalions also saw action in the Second Battle of Ypres which had begun in April 1915 and an action near La Brique in Belgium where Corporal Alfred George Drake, also of the 8th Battalion, was posthumously awarded the Victoria Cross for his actions on 23 November 1915. The battalions then took part in the Battle of Delville Wood in September 1916, the Battle of Flers–Courcelette in September 1916 and the advance to the Hindenburg Line as well as the Battle of Arras in April 1917, the Battle of Langemark in August 1917 and the Battle of Passchendaele in October 1917 before taking part in the Battle of St Quentin in March 1918 and the Battle of the Avre in April 1918.

The 9th (Service) Battalion landed at Boulogne-sur-Mer as part of the 42nd Brigade in the 14th (Light) Division in May 1915 for service on the Western Front and took part in most of the same battles as the 7th and 8th battalions.

The 10th (Service) Battalion and 11th (Service) Battalion landed at Boulogne-sur-Mer as part of the 59th Brigade in the 20th (Light) Division in July 1915 for service on the Western Front. The battalions saw action at the Battle of Mont Sorrel in June 1916, the Battle of Delville Wood in September 1916 and the Battle of Guillemont in September 1916 as well as the Battle of Flers–Courcelette in September 1916, the Battle of Morval in September 1916 and the Battle of Le Transloy in October 1916 before taking part in the advance to the Hindenburg Line, the Battle of Langemarck in August 1917, the Battle of the Menin Road Ridge in September 1917, the Battle of Polygon Wood in September 1917 and the Battle of Cambrai in December 1917.

The 12th (Service) Battalion landed at Boulogne-sur-Mer as part of the 60th Brigade in the 20th (Light) Division in July 1915 for service on the Western Front and took part in most of the same battles as the 10th and 11th battalions. The 12th battalion also took part in the action at Pietre, part of a subsidiary attack on the 25th of September 1915 during the battle of Loos where it advanced along in support of the Indian Corps. The battalion made good ground but retired when the units on both its flanks were forced back and it lost many many killed, wounded and missing during this withdrawal.

The 13th (Service) Battalion landed at Boulogne-sur-Mer as part of the 111th Brigade in the 37th Division in July 1915 for service on the Western Front. The battalion saw action at the Battle of the Somme in Summer 1916 and the advance to the Hindenburg Line as well as the Battle of Arras in April 1917, the Battle of Passchendaele in Autumn 1917 and the Battle of Cambrai in November 1917 before taking part in the Battle of the Lys in April 1918, the Third Battle of the Aisne in May 1918, the Second Battle of the Somme in August 1918, the Battles of the Hindenburg Line and the Final Advance in Picardy.

The 16th (Service) Battalion (St Pancras) landed at Le Havre as part of the 117th Brigade in the 39th Division in March 1916 for service on the Western Front. The battalion saw action at the Battle of the Somme in Autumn 1916, the Battle of Pilckem Ridge in August 1917 and the Battle of Langemarck in August 1917 as well as the Battle of the Menin Road Ridge in September 1917, the Battle of Polygon Wood in September 1917 and the Second Battle of Passchendaele in November 1917 before taking part in the Battle of St Quentin in March 1918 and the Second Battle of Bapaume in August 1918.

==== Inter-war deployment ====
c. 1920 regimental recruitment poster

In October 1922 the 2nd Battalion was deployed to Turkey as part of the response to the Chanak Crisis, which had followed Turkish efforts to push the Greek armies out of Turkey and restore Turkish rule in the Allied occupied territories of Turkey, primarily in Constantinople.

==== Second World War ====
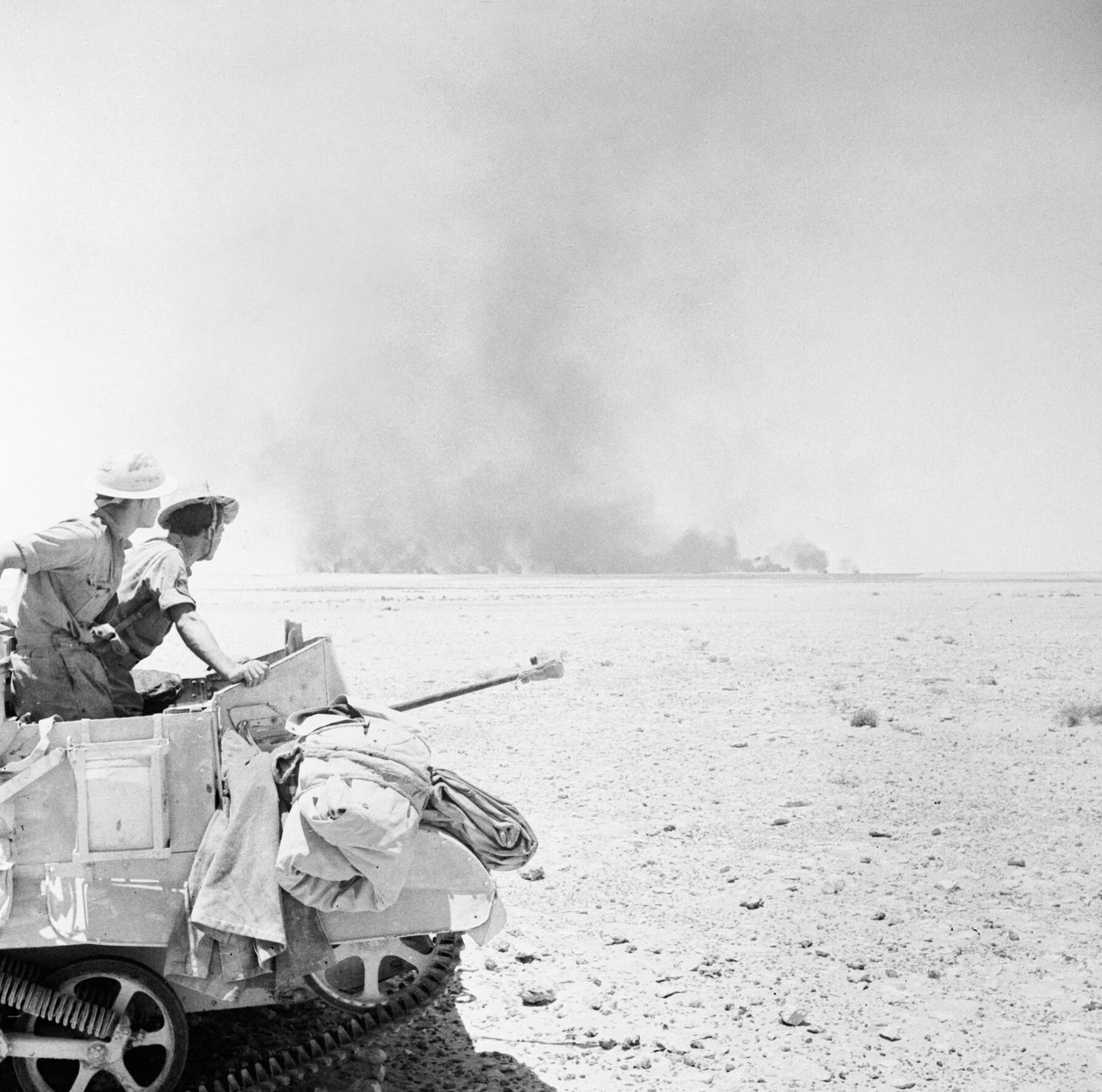
Regimental troops watching a British supply dump at El Alamein be destroyed, 1942

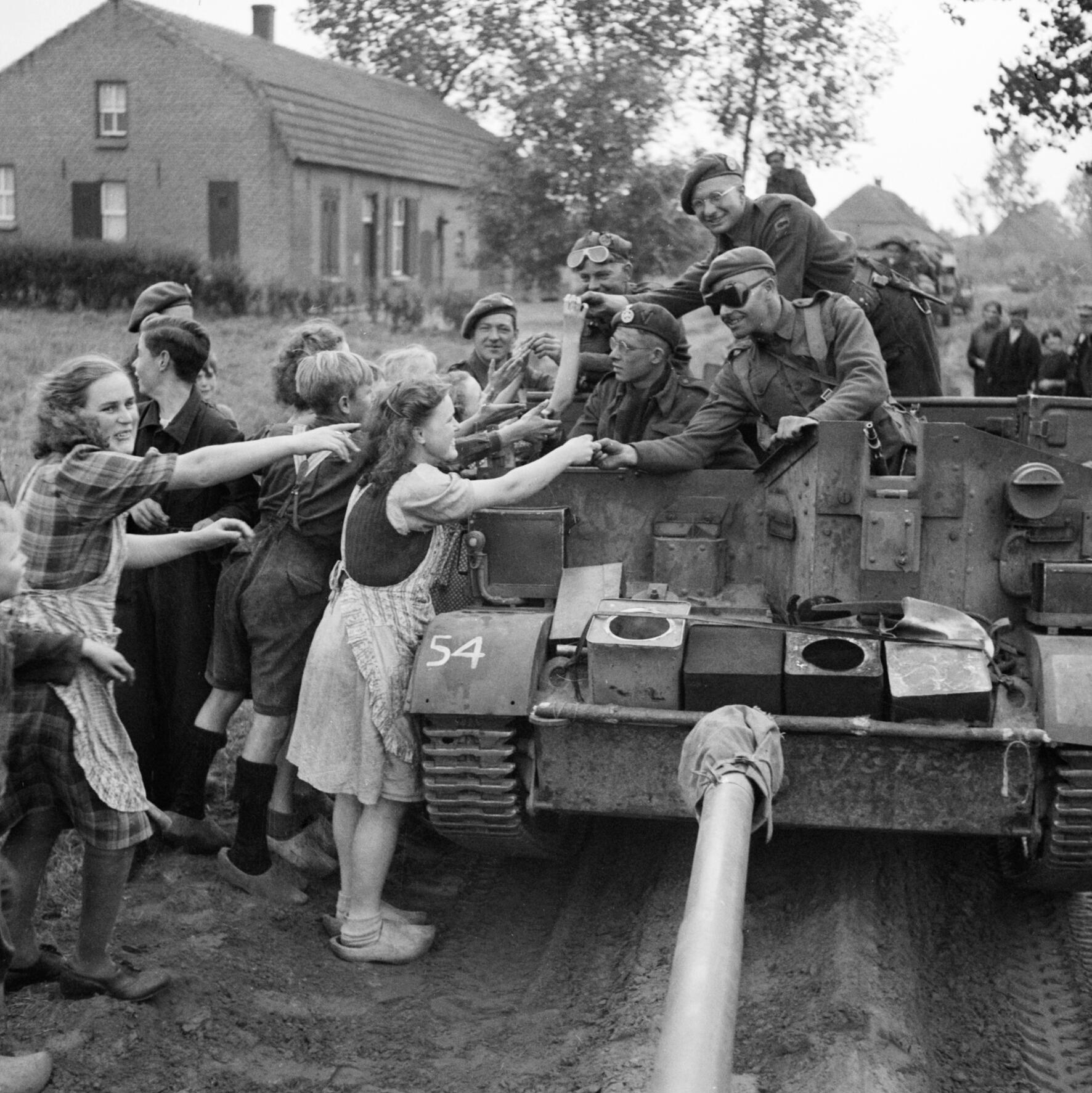
The crew of a regimental Universal Carrier handing out chocolate to Dutch civilians, 22 September 1944

The 1st Battalion, Rifle Brigade was in England on the outbreak of the Second World War, originally part of the 1st Support Group, part of the 1st Armoured Division. In late April 1940, however, the battalion transferred to the newly created 30th Infantry Brigade and landed in France the following month within the British Expeditionary Force (BEF) but was lost at the defence of Calais, where the brigade slowed the German advance and enabled the Dunkirk evacuation to proceed. The battalion was reformed in the United Kingdom and became part of the 2nd Armoured Brigade of the 1st Armoured Division and took part in many battles in the North African Campaign before transferring to the 22nd Armoured Brigade of the 7th Armoured Division in June 1942.

Now commanded by Lieutenant Colonel Frederick Stephens, the 1st Battalion's four 6-pounders were credited with destroying many tanks from the 21st Panzer Division at the Battle of Alam el Halfa on 31 August 1942. The 1st Battalion subsequently took part in the Second Battle of El Alamein and the Tunisian Campaign until May 1943 when the war in North Africa ended with the surrender of almost 250,000 German and Italian soldiers. The battalion, with the rest of the 7th Armoured Division, took part in the Allied invasion of Italy, and the early stages of the Italian Campaign, in September 1943, returning to England in January 1944 and took part in the invasion of Normandy in June 1944, going on to fight throughout the North West Europe Campaign until Victory in Europe Day in May 1945, ending the war in Hamburg, Germany, and commanded throughout by Lieutenant Colonel A. G. V. Paley.

On the outbreak of war the 2nd Battalion, commanded since July 1938 by Lieutenant Colonel Edward Williams, was stationed in Palestine as part of the 14th Infantry Brigade of the 8th Infantry Division. The battalion, then commanded by Lieutenant Colonel James Renton, later fought with distinction as part of the 7th Motor Brigade in the 1st Armoured Division in the Western Desert Campaign, especially in the "Snipe" action during the Second Battle of El Alamein in October 1942, when the four 6-pounders of the battalion, supported by a 6-pounder Anti-Tank battery of the Royal Artillery, knocked out over 50 German and Italian tanks in a lengthy battle. Lieutenant Colonel Victor Buller Turner, commanding the battalion, received the Victoria Cross for his actions fighting with the guns.

Commanded by Lieutenant Colonel Thomas Pearson, the battalion, alongside the 1st Battalion, continued to play a prominent role in the final stages of the Tunisian Campaign. In September 1943 the battalion transferred to the 7th Armoured Brigade in the 10th Armoured Division, remaining with that formation in North Africa until May 1944, when it transferred to the 61st Lorried Infantry Brigade in the 6th Armoured Division for service in the Italian Campaign, seeing action in the Fourth Battle of Monte Cassino, the Gothic Line and the Spring 1945 offensive in Italy, which brought an end to the war in Italy in early May 1945.

The 7th Battalion was formed by renaming the 1st Battalion the London Rifle Brigade in January 1941. The battalion became part of the 23rd Armoured Brigade, then serving under the 8th Armoured Division, and was sent with the division to Egypt in July 1942 where it played a role in the First Battle of El Alamein before, the following month, becoming a part of the 7th Motor Brigade, part of the 1st Armoured Division. It later transferred to the independent 9th Armoured Brigade and finally to the 61st Lorried Infantry Brigade and was engaged throughout the Italian Campaign from May 1944 onwards, commanded throughout by Lieutenant Colonel Douglas Darling.

The 8th Battalion, Rifle Brigade was formed in early January 1941 by the redesignation of the 2nd Battalion, London Rifle Brigade, spent most of its existence in the United Kingdom and took part in the invasion of Normandy in June 1944, as part of the 29th Armoured Brigade in the 11th Armoured Division, and saw action in the North West Europe Campaign.

The 9th Battalion was created in late May 1941 by renaming the 1st Battalion, Tower Hamlets Rifles. The battalion was part of the 2nd Support Group of the 2nd Armoured Division and then the 200th Guards Brigade until June 1942. The 9th later served with the 4th Armoured Brigade in the 7th Armoured Division and took part in the Battle of Gazala in May 1942 during the North African Campaign before being disbanded in August 1942.

The 10th Battalion was formed in 1941 by renaming the 2nd Battalion, Tower Hamlets Rifles and transferred to the 26th Armoured Brigade of the 6th Armoured Division. The battalion, commanded by Lieutenant Colonel Adrian Gore, saw service with the division in Tunisia in late 1942 and 1943 before, in May 1944, transferring to the 61st Lorried Infantry Brigade, commanded by Gore, now a brigadier, serving with the 2nd and 7th Battalions in the Italian Campaign. The battalion was disbanded in late March 1945, most of the personnel being sent to the 2nd Battalion.

==== Post-Second World War ====
From spring 1946 a number of surplus Rifle Brigade subalterns were transferred to No. 1 T-Force, a British Army unit which was active in the Ruhr. Their role was to carry out reparations work, evacuating military and industrial equipment needed to rebuild British industry. The 1st Battalion went on to serve in the Mau Mau Uprising in Kenya in 1954 and the Malayan Emergency in 1956.

=== Amalgamations ===
The 1st Battalion was renamed the 3rd Green Jackets, The Rifle Brigade in 1958 and was amalgamated with the 1st Green Jackets (43rd and 52nd) and the King's Royal Rifle Corps to form the Royal Green Jackets on 1 January 1966.

== Regimental museum ==
The regimental collection is held by the Royal Green Jackets (Rifles) Museum which is based at Peninsula Barracks in Winchester.

== Battle honours ==
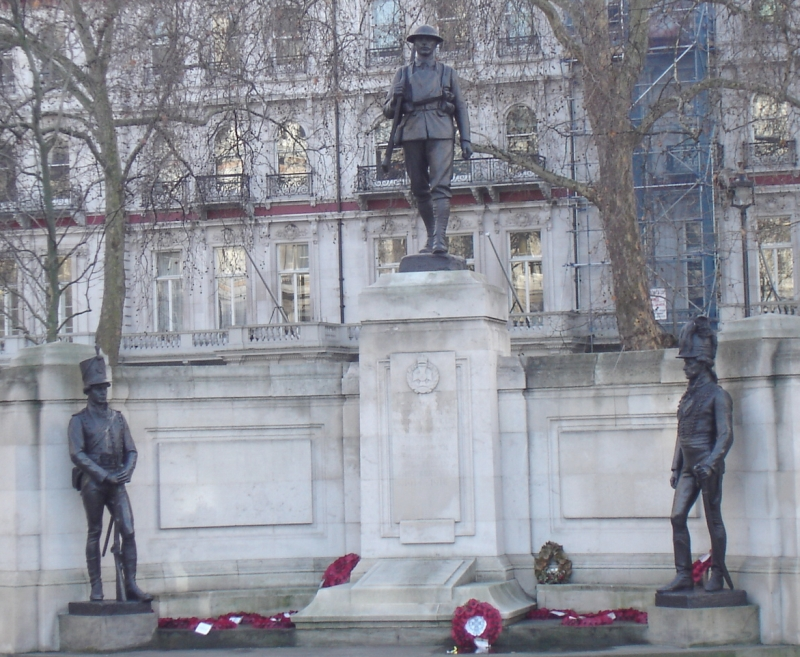
The Rifle Brigade War Memorial in London

The regiment was awarded the following battle honours:

- Copenhagen, Monte Video, Rolica, Vimiera, Corunna, Busaco, Barrosa, Fuentes d'Onor, Ciudad Rodrigo, Badajoz, Salamanca, Vittoria, Pyrenees, Nivelle, Nive, Orthes, Toulouse, Peninsula, Waterloo, South Africa 1846–47, South Africa 1851–2–3, Alma, Inkerman, Sevastopol, Lucknow, Ashantee 1873–74, Ali Masjid, Afghanistan 1878–79, Burma 1885–87, Khartoum, Defence of Ladysmith, Relief of Ladysmith, South Africa 1899–1902
- The Great War (21 battalions): Le Cateau, Retreat from Mons, Marne 1914, Aisne 1914 '18, Armentières 1914, Neuve Chapelle, Ypres 1915 '17, Gravenstafel, St. Julien, Frezenberg, Bellewaarde, Aubers, Hooge 1915, Somme 1916 '18, Albert 1916 '18, Bazentin, Delville Wood, Guillemont, Flers-Courcelette, Morval, Le Transloy, Ancre Heights, Ancre 1916 '18, Arras 1917 '18, Vimy 1917, Scarpe 1917 '18, Arleux, Messines 1917, Pilckem, Langemarck 1917, Menin Road, Polygon Wood, Broodseinde, Poelcappelle, Passchendaele, Cambrai 1917 '18, St. Quentin, Rosières, Avre, Villers Bretonneux, Lys, Hazebrouck, Béthune, Drocourt-Quéant, Hindenburg Line, Havrincourt, Canal du Nord, Selle, Valenciennes, Sambre, France and Flanders 1914–18, Macedonia 1915–18
- The Second World War: Calais 1940, Villers Bocage, Odon, Bourguébus Ridge, Mont Pincon, Le Perier Ridge, Falaise, Antwerp, Hechtel, Nederrijn, Lower Maas, Roer, Leese, Aller, North-West Europe 1940 '44–45, Egyptian Frontier 1940, Beda Fomm, Mersa el Brega, Agedabia, Derna Aerodrome, Tobruk 1941, Sidi Rezegh 1941, Chor es Sufan, Saunnu, Gazala, Knightsbridge, Defence of Alamein Line, Ruweisat, Alam el Halfa, El Alamein, Tebaga Gap, Medjez el Bab, Kassarine, Thala, Fondouk, Fondouk Pass, El Kourzia, Djebel Kournine, Tunis, Hammam Lif, North Africa 1940–43, Cardito, Cassino II, Liri Valley, Melfa Crossing, Monte Rotondo, Capture of Perugia, Monte Malbe, Arezzo, Advance to Florence, Gothic Line, Orsara, Tossigniano, Argenta Gap, Fossa Sembalina, Italy 1943–45

== Notable members ==
- John Baird – Rifleman and revolutionary.
- Thomas Sydney Beckwith – Officer in the 95th, served in the Peninsular War.
- Rowland Fraser, Scotland internationalist, killed while serving with the brigade.
- James Fullarton – Officer who saw action at the Battle of Waterloo
- William Green – Rifleman and author.
- Benjamin Randell Harris – Rifleman and author.
- Major-General Sir Henry Havelock – Officer of the 95th, later prominent in India.
- Sir John Kincaid (1787 – 1862) Officer of the 95th who wrote a first hand account of his service under Wellington.
- Alfred Mendes - author and grandfather of director Sam Mendes
- David Niven – Lieutenant and actor.
- Thomas Plunket – Rifleman who shot a French general
- Sir Harry Smith, 1st Baronet – Officer of the 95th at Badajoz and Waterloo.

== See also ==
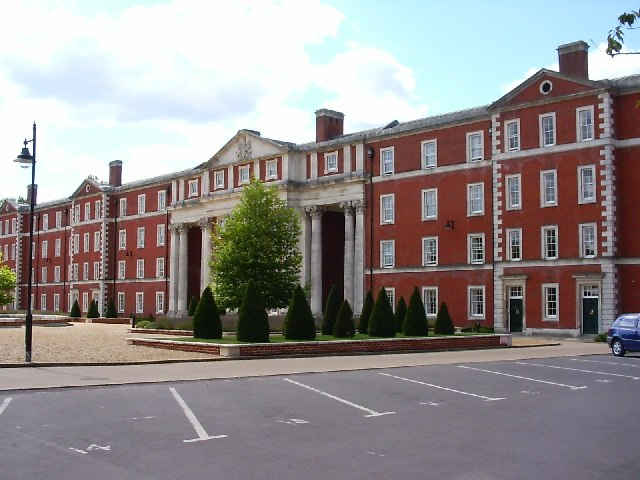
Peninsula Barracks in Winchester, the home of the Rifle Brigade

- History of British light infantry
- New Zealand Rifle Brigade (Earl of Liverpool's Own) – short lived, World War I formation that fought on the Western Front.
- Combeforce
- 60th King's Royal Rifle Corps – sister regiment sharing much history & many traditions.
- Richard Sharpe – fictional hero of Bernard Cornwell's "Sharpe" novels, which prominently feature the 95th.
- Rifleman Dodd – fictional hero of C. S. Forester's book Death to the French (Rifleman Dodd in the United States), a member of the 95th.
- The Spanish Bride by Georgette Heyer – a novel based on Harry Smith and his Spanish wife during the Spanish campaign and the Battle of Waterloo.
- Pre-modern special forces

== Sources ==
- Bryant, Arthur (1972). Jackets of green: a study of the history, philosophy and character of the Rifle Brigade. Collins.
- Hadaway, Stuart (October 2000), Burnham, Robert (ed.), Rifleman Thomas Plunkett: 'A Pattern for the Battalion, archived from the original on 3 March 2016
- Harington, Andrew L. (1 June 1974). "Talk given by AL Harington, Sir Harry Smith and South Africa, 1834–1852". Military History Journal. 3 (1). South Africa: The South African Military History Society. ISSN 0026-4016.
- Joslen, Lt-Col H.F. (1990) [1st. Pub. HMSO:1960]. Orders of Battle, Second World War, 1939–1945. London: London Stamp Exchange. ISBN 0-948130-03-2.
- Nosworthy, Brent (1997). Battle Tactics of Napoleon and His Enemies. Constable.
- Latimer, Jon (2003) [2002]. Alamein. London: John Murray. ISBN 0-7195-6213-9.
- Playfair, Major-General I. S. O. (2004) [HMSO 1966]. The Mediterranean and Middle East: The Destruction of the Axis Forces in Africa. History of the Second World War United Kingdom Military Series. Vol. IV. Uckfield, UK: Naval & Military Press. ISBN 1-84574-068-8.
- Summerfield, Stephen (2014). Coote-Manningham's Shorncliffe lecture of 1803 and the origins of the 95th Rifles (PDF). Shorncliffe Trust. ISBN 978-1907417573. Archived from the original (PDF) on 14 September 2016.
- Urban, Mark (2003). Rifles: Six Years with Wellington's Legendary Sharpshooters. Faber & Faber. ISBN 0-571-21681-1.
- Wilkinson-Latham, Christopher (1975). The Royal Green Jackets. Osprey Publishing. ISBN 978-0-85045-249-5.
