= Coote Manningham =

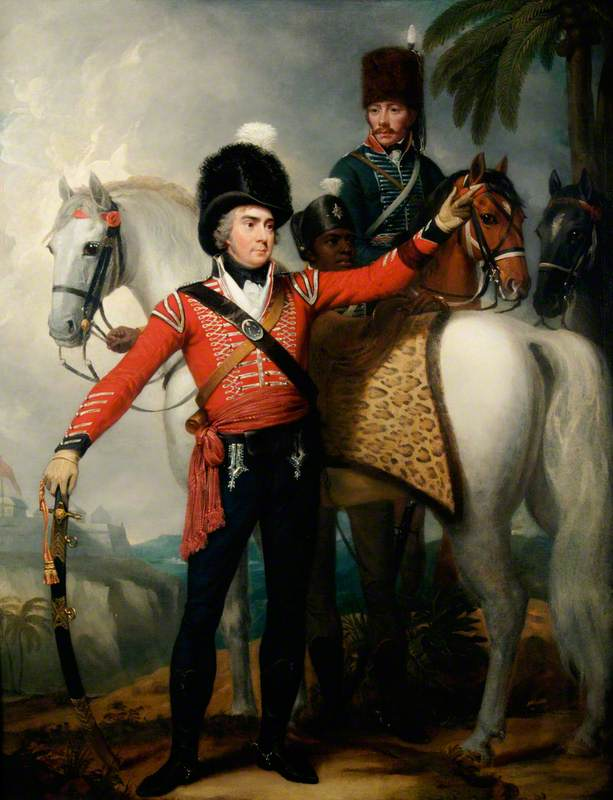
- Portrait of Manningham (first from left)
- Born: 1765; England
- Died: 26 August 1809 (aged 44); Maidstone, Kent
- Burial place: All Saints Church, Little Bookham
- Military career
- Allegiance: Great Britain; United Kingdom
- Branch: British Army
- Service years: –1809
- Rank: Major general
- Units: 39th Regiment of Foot; 81st Regiment of Foot
- Commands: 95th Rifles
- Conflicts: American War of Independence; Great Siege of Gibraltar; French Revolutionary Wars; Napoleonic Wars; Peninsular War; Battle of Corunna

Major-General Coote Manningham (1765 – 26 August 1809) was a British Army officer who served in the American War of Independence and French Revolutionary and Napoleonic Wars. Manningham played a significant role in the creation and early development of the 95th Rifles, of which he was colonel-in-chief.

== Life ==
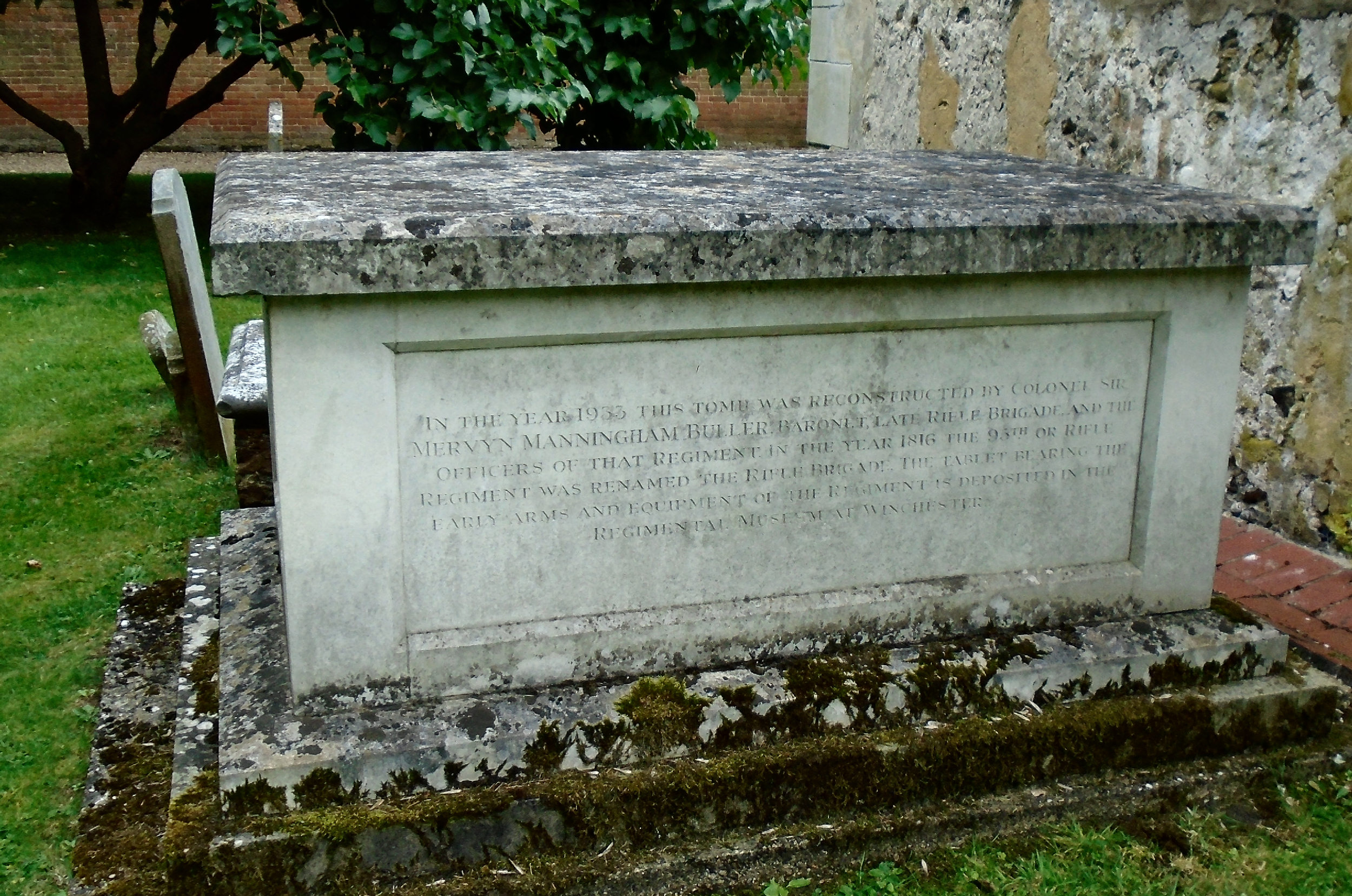
Manningham's tomb in All Saints Church, Little Bookham

Coote Manningham was born in 1765, the second son of Charles Manningham of Surrey. He began his career in the British Army as a subaltern in the 39th Regiment of Foot, serving under his uncle Sir Robert Boyd at the Great Siege of Gibraltar. On the outbreak of the French Revolutionary Wars in 1793, Manningham was appointed as major of a light infantry battalion, serving in the West Indies. He was subsequently promoted to lieutenant colonel of the 81st Regiment of Foot before being made adjutant general on the staff of Major-general Gordon Forbes in Saint-Domingue.

In early 1800, Manningham and Lieutenant-colonel William Stewart proposed, and were given the assignment, to use what they had learned while leading light infantry troops to train the Experimental Corps of Riflemen, which eventually became the 95th Rifles. Over the course of that year's summer, the new corps was trained in exercises developed by Manningham and were quickly deployed to provide covering fire for the unsuccessful Ferrol Expedition. Around 1800, he married Anna Maria Pollen (1783–1822), the daughter of the Reverend George Pollen of Little Bookham.

Manningham died on 26 August 1809 in Maidstone, Kent from illness contracted during the Battle of Corunna in the opening stage of the Peninsular War, in which the 95th Rifles demonstrated the tactical value of the approach developed by Manningham and Stewart. He is buried in the churchyard of All Saints Church in Little Bookham but a memorial is also placed in the west aisle of the north transept in Westminster Abbey. The inscription under the monument by John Bacon honouring Manningham in Westminster Abbey conveys the esteem in which he was held by his contemporaries:

The distinguished soldier to whom friendship erects this inadequate memorial, began his career of military action at the siege of Gibraltar, and concluded it at the victory of Corunna, to which his skill and gallantry conspicuously contributed. He fell an early victim to the vicissitudes of climate, and the severities of war, and died 26th Aug., 1809, aged forty-four. Yet, reader, regard not his fate as premature, since his cup of glory was full, and he was not summoned till his virtue and patriotism had achieved even here a brilliant recompense: for his name is engraved on the annals of his country. In him the man and the Christian tempered the warrior, and England might proudly present him to the world as the model of a British soldier.

After his death his post as colonel-in-chief of the 95th Rifles was filled by Sir David Dundas.
