= John Rolt (British Army officer) =

British Army general

Lieutenant-General Sir John Rolt GCH KCB
- Born: c. 1783; Cork, Ireland
- Died: 8 November 1856 (aged 73); Southernhay, Exeter
- Military career
- Allegiance: United Kingdom
- Branch: British Army
- Rank: Lieutenant-General
- Conflicts: Napoleonic Wars
- Awards: Knight Commander of the Order of the Bath; Knight Grand Cross of the Royal Guelphic Order; Army Gold Cross with one clasp Military General Service Medal with three clasps

Lieutenant-General Sir John Rolt GCH KCB (c. 1783 – 8 November 1856) was a British Army officer who became colonel of the 2nd (The Queen's Royal) Regiment of Foot.

== Military career ==
Rolt was commissioned as an ensign in the 58th Regiment of Foot on 1 March 1800. He was wounded during the Egyptian Campaign in 1801. He took part in the Siege of Ciudad Rodrigo in January 1812 and the Battle of Badajoz in March 1812 during the Peninsular War, later receiving the Army Gold Cross for Corunna, Nivelle, Nive, Orthes and Toulouse, and the Military General Service Medal with clasps for Egypt, Busaco and Pyrenees.

Rolt became commanding officer of the 2nd Regiment of Foot in 1823 and went on to be colonel of the regiment on 29 August 1853.

Military offices
Preceded by Lord Saltoun	Colonel of the 2nd (The Queen's Royal) Regiment of Foot; 1853–1856	Succeeded by Sir James Schoedde
