= Peninsular Medal =

Peninsular Medal may refer to:

- Army Gold Medal, a gold medal and cross awarded to field and general officers during the Peninsular War
- Military General Service Medal (also called "Silver Medal"), a campaign medal awarded to all ranks for services during the Peninsular War
