= Richard Cunningham =

Richard Cunningham or Richie Cunningham may refer to:

- Richie Cunningham, a fictional character played by Ron Howard on the sitcom Happy Days
- Richard Cunningham (English Army officer) (d. 1696), achieved the rank of Brigadier-General
- Richie Cunningham (American football) (born 1970), former American football placekicker
- Richard Cunningham (botanist) (1793–1835), English botanist in New South Wales
- Richard Cunningham (actor), English actor
- Richard Cunningham (Canadian politician) (1748–1823), Irish-born farmer and political figure in Nova Scotia
- Richard Cunningham (American politician) (c. 1944–2021), American politician from Connecticut
- Rich Cunningham, American politician from Utah
- Dick Cunningham (American football) (Richard Karekin Cunningham), American football linebacker

== See also ==
- Rick Cunningham (disambiguation)
- Dick Cunningham, American basketball player
