= James Holmes Schoedde =

British Army general

Lieutenant-General Sir James Holmes Schoedde KCB
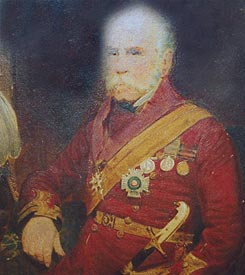
- Born: 1786
- Died: 14 November 1861 (aged 74–75)
- Military career
- Allegiance: United Kingdom
- Branch: British Army
- Rank: Lieutenant-General
- Conflicts: Egyptian Campaign; Peninsular War; First Opium War
- Awards: Knight Commander of the Order of the Bath

Lieutenant-General Sir James Holmes Schoedde KCB (1786 – 14 November 1861) was a British Army officer who became colonel of the 2nd (The Queen's Royal) Regiment of Foot and the 55th Regiment of Foot.

== Early life ==
James Holmes Schoëdde was born in 1786 and was a 'child of the regiment'. His father, Lieutenant Colonel C Lewis Theodore Schoëdde, had entered the 60th in the year 1780, and left it as lieutenant-colonel in 1805.

== Military career ==
When only in his fifteenth year, Schoëdde obtained an ensigncy in Lowenstein's Levy (Lowenstein's Light Infantry Regiment) in May 1800. He served in the campaign in Egypt in 1801, and for his services received the Gold Medal from the Grand Seignior. (Note: The regiment fought in Egypt 1801. It was disbanded in May 1802 and incorporated into the 5th battalion of the 60th Regiment.) In April 1802, he was appointed to the 5th battalion of the 60th Regiment, and became a captain when nineteen years old in 1805, and did not obtain another step in regimental rank for twenty years.

He embarked with Major Davy in the ‘Malabar’ transport at Cork (June 1808), and returned there in 1814 with Major Galiffe, having been in almost every one of Wellington's battles and sieges (besides innumerable minor affairs), with the exception of Albuera.

He took part in the Battle of Roliça in August 1808, the Battle of Vimeiro also in August 1808, the Battle of Talavera in July 1809, the Battle of Bussaco in September 1810, the Battle of Fuentes de Oñoro in May 1811 and the Siege of Ciudad Rodrigo in January 1812 during the Peninsular War. He was also present at the Siege of Badajoz in March 1812, the Battle of Salamanca in July 1812, the Battle of Vitoria in June 1813, the Battle of the Pyrenees in July 1813, the Battle of Nivelle in November 1813, the Battle of the Nive in December 1813, the Battle of Orthez in February 1814 and the Battle of Toulouse in April 1814.

For these services, he later received the Military General Service Medal with fourteen clasps. (Note: It is worth noting that, by comparison, the Duke of Wellington could also have been awarded just 14 clasps) He, as well as Galiffe, was given the Army Gold Medal for Nivelle, and he was promoted brevet-major for Vittoria. (Note: At the Battle of the Nivelle Major Neville Galiffe was given command of the composite Light Battalion of his Division. The three Rifle Companies of the 5/60th were commanded by Major Schoëdde, who was awarded the Gold Medal in consequence. Because he had the Gold Medal, he could not be granted the Nivelle clasp for the MGSM.)

He served in Gibraltar from 1816 to 1818, in Canada from 1818 to 1824, and then, having returned home, and having been promoted major in January 1825, he went with the 1st battalion 60th Regiment to revisit some of the scenes of his former services in Portugal, with the force known as "Canning's expedition". They remained in Portugal 1826 and 1827. Schoëdde returned home in the latter year, and served with the 60th until March 1829, when he was promoted to an unattached lieutenant-colonelcy.

In June 1830 he became lieutenant-colonel of the 48th regiment and in March 1833 went to command the 55th regiment, in which he continued in command for twelve years.

The greater part of his time in the 48th and 55th was actively employed, for from 30 October to 6 November 1841, he was in the East Indies, and from 7 November 1841 to February 1844 in China. In 1841-42 there was war in China, and Schoëdde (who had become colonel in the army in November 1841) commanded the left column at the affair of Chapoo; and as major-general in 1842 under Lieutenant General Sir Hugh Gough he commanded the 2nd brigade at the escalade and storming of Tching-Kiang-Foo.

Gough thanked him in his dispatch from Chapoo dated 20 May 1841. And again, in his dispatch from Tching-Kiang-Foo dated 25 July 1842, he used the following words: ‘I cannot too strongly express my approval of the spirited and judicious way in which Major-General Schoëdde fulfilled my orders’. His name was included in the vote of thanks from both Houses of Parliament for the ‘energy, ability, and gallantry with which the various services had been performed’; and having been made ADC to the Queen on 25 November 1841, and colonel in the army, he was, on the 23 December 1842, made major-general in India, Knight Commander of the Bath, and received the medal for the China campaign.

In November 1845, Schoëdde exchanged to half-pay, having been forty-five years on active service and being sixty years of age. He became a major-general on 20 June 1854. He went on to be colonel of the 2nd (The Queen's Royal) Regiment of Foot on 9 November 1856 and colonel of the 55th Regiment of Foot on 28 May 1857.

On 14 November 1861 he died at his home at Lyndhurst in the New Forest, and was buried in Saint Michael and All Angels churchyard. His friend and adjutant, General Sir Henry Charles Barnston Daubeny, placed in the church a large brass plate with an inscription reading ‘Lieut.-General Sir James Holmes Schoëdde, KCB, aged seventy-five years’.

== Notes ==
Military offices
| Preceded by Sir John Rolt | Colonel of the 2nd (The Queen's Royal) Regiment of Foot; 1856–1857 | Succeeded by Sir John Spink |
