= Hagart =

Hagart may refer to:

- Charles Hagart, a British Army officer
- John Hagart, a Scottish association football player and manager
- Hagart-Alexander baronets, a title in the Baronetage of the United Kingdom

== See also ==
- Hagar (disambiguation)
- Haggart, a surname
