= 7th Queen's Own Hussars =

Cavalry regiment in the British Army

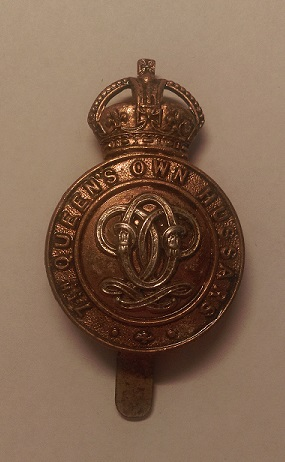
- Crest and tie colours of the 7th Hussars
- Active: 1689–1714; 1715–1958
- Country: Scotland 1689–1694; England 1694–1697; Scotland 1697–1707; Great Britain (1707–1800); United Kingdom of Great Britain and Ireland (1801–1922); United Kingdom (1922–1958)
- Branch: Army
- Type: Cavalry of the Line/Royal Armoured Corps
- Role: Light Cavalry
- Size: one regiment
- Nickname: The Saucy Seventh/The Lilywhite Seventh
- Mottos: Honi soit qui mal y pense (French, Evil Upon Him who Evil Thinks)
- March: (Canter) The Campbells Are Coming (Quick) Bannocks o'Barley Meal (Slow) The Garb of Old Gaul
- Anniversaries: Waterloo Day

Commanders
- Notable commanders: Field Marshal Earl Haig

The 7th Queen's Own Hussars was a cavalry regiment in the British Army, first formed in 1689. It saw service for three centuries, including the First World War and the Second World War. The regiment survived the immediate post-war reduction in forces, but following the 1957 Defence White Paper, it was amalgamated with the 3rd The King's Own Hussars, forming the Queen's Own Hussars in 1958.

== History ==
=== Formation; 17th century ===
In April 1689, several Independent Troops of Scots Horse were formed as a short-term response to the 1689-1691 Williamite War in Scotland. These were re-organised in December 1690 as two regiments, one commanded by Colonel Richard Cunningham and in line with prevailing practice, it was known as Cunningham's Regiment of Scots Dragoons. In February 1694, it was transferred onto the English military establishment and shipped to Flanders, where it took part in operations associated with the 1695 Siege of Namur.

All participants in the Nine Years War were financially exhausted, and there was little military activity after the fall of Namur. On 1 October 1696, Cunningham was promoted to Brigadier-General; Lord Jedburgh succeeded him and the regiment became Jedburgh's Regiment of Dragoons.

=== Wars of the 18th century ===
The regiment spent most of the 1702–1714 War of the Spanish Succession based in Edinburgh; in 1707, Jedburgh transferred the Colonelcy to Lord Polwarth, who sold it to William Kerr in 1709. In 1711, Kerr's Dragoons joined the field army in Flanders but the war was winding down and the regiment disbanded in 1714, before being reconstituted in July 1715 by George I, as HRH the Princess of Wales's Own Royal Regiment of Dragoons, in honour of Princess Caroline. During the 1715 Jacobite rising, it fought at Sheriffmuir, but this was its only significant action until 1743. Renamed The Queen's Own Royal Regiment of Dragoons after the coronation of George II in 1727; William Kerr finally stepped down in 1741 and Sir John Cope took over as Colonel.

A regimental private (left) in 1742

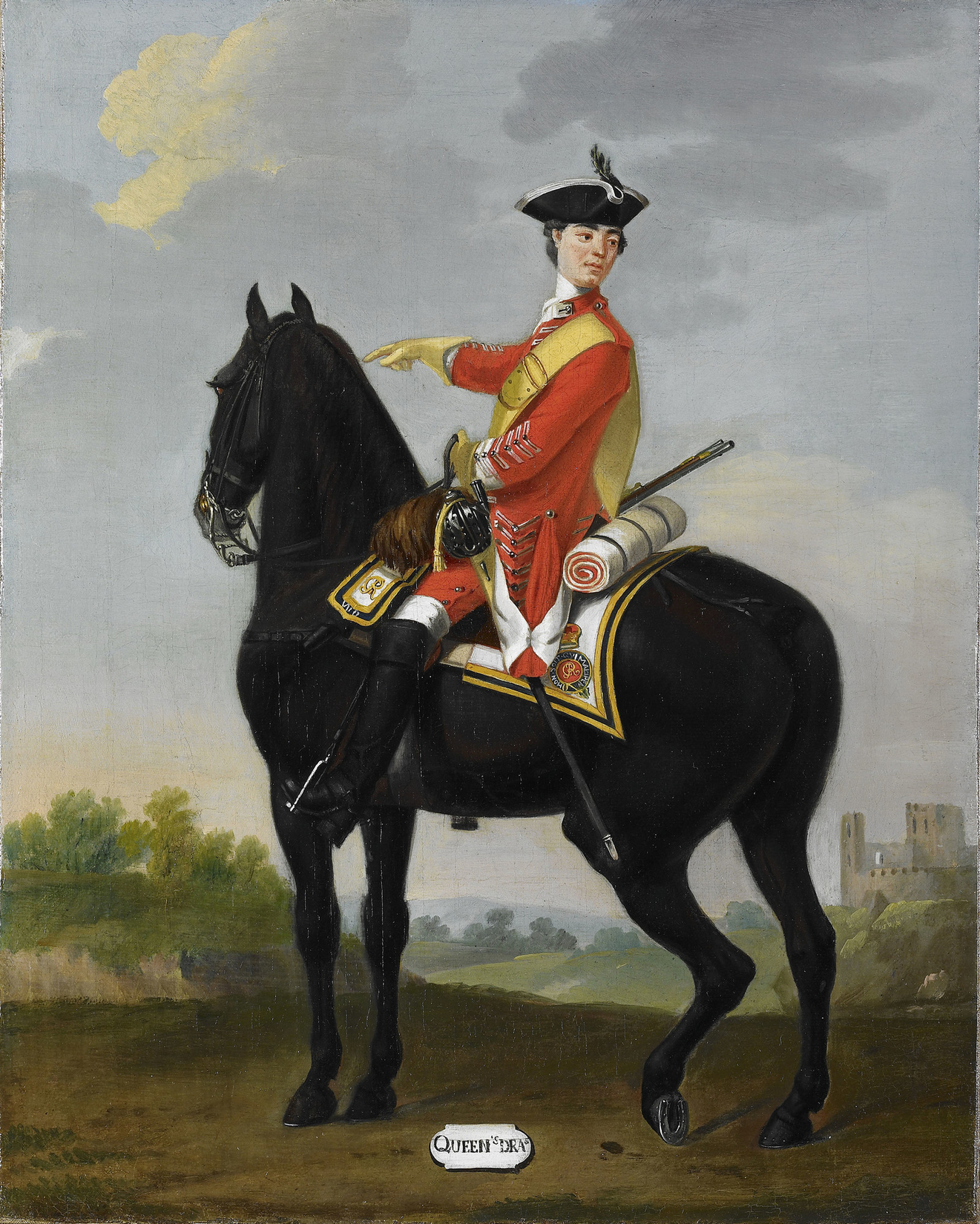
c. 1751 portrait of a regimental private

The unit returned to Flanders in 1742 during the 1740–1748 War of the Austrian Succession, taking part in the battles of Dettingen, Fontenoy, Rocoux and finally Lauffeld in July 1747. The 1748 Treaty of Aix-la-Chapelle ended the war and the regiment returned to England.

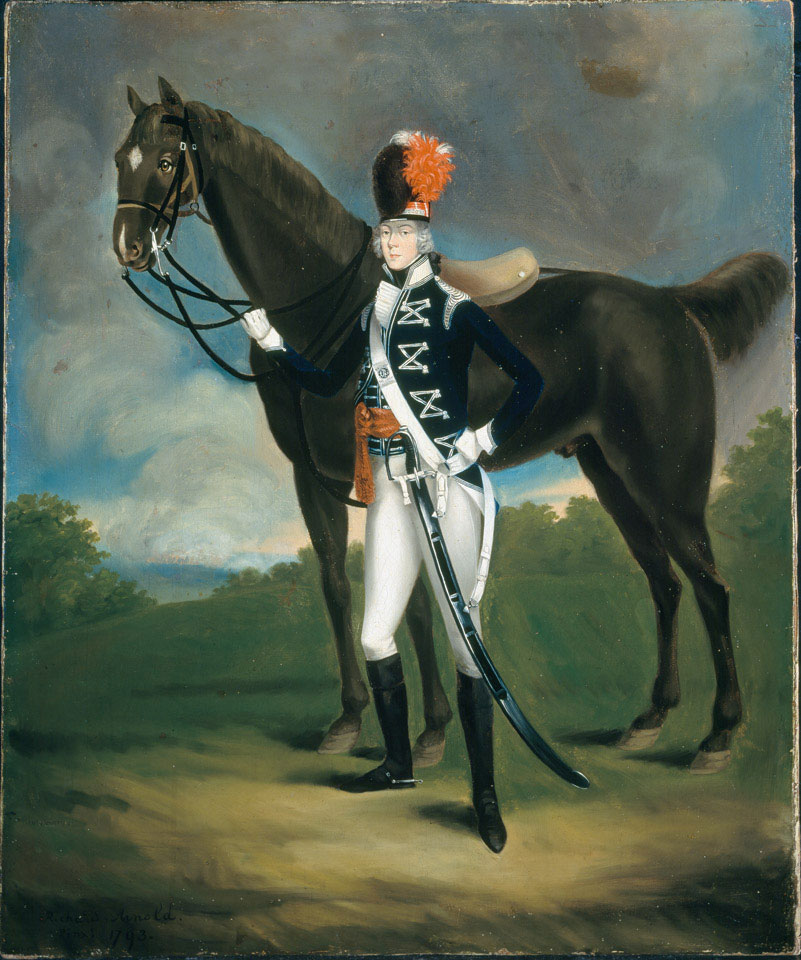
1793 portrait of a regimental officer

When the Seven Years' War began in 1756, the regiment took part in the June 1758 Raid on St Malo, at which 100 enemy vessels were burned, the Raid on Cherbourg in August 1758 and the Battle of Warburg in July 1760. In 1783, it was classed as 'light dragoons,' light cavalry used for reconnaissance and retitled the 7th (The Queen's Own) Regiment of (Light) Dragoons. During the French Revolutionary Wars, it fought at Beaumont in April 1794 and Willems in May.

=== Early 19th century ===
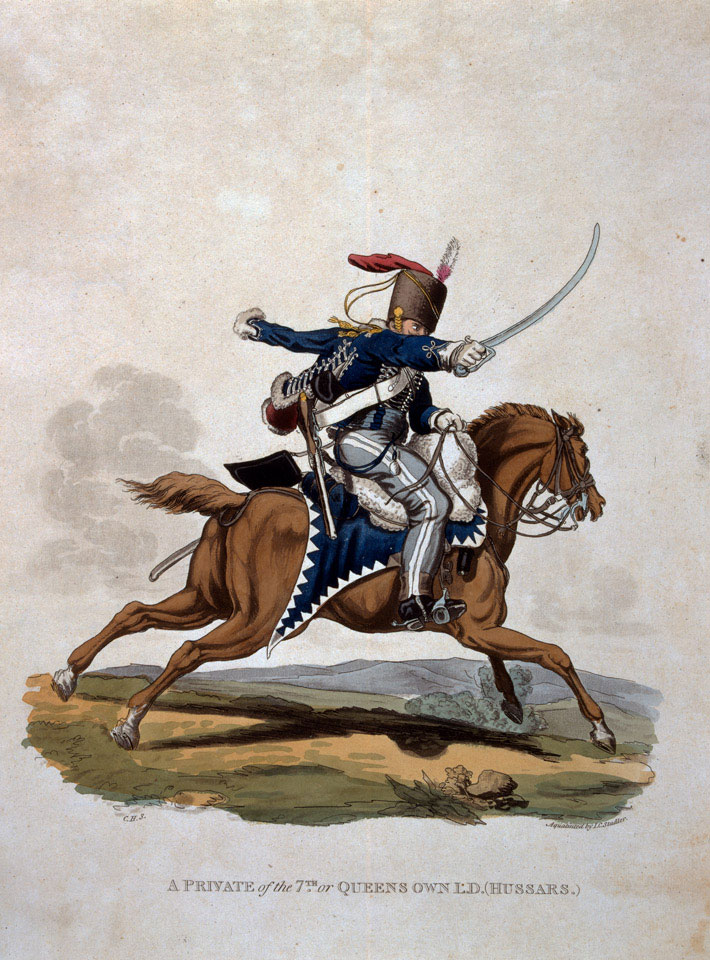
1812 engraving of a regimental private

In 1807, the regiment was designated as Hussars and retitled 7th (The Queen's Own) Regiment of (Light) Dragoons (Hussars). Sent to Corunna in October 1808 to support Sir John Moore's retreat, they fought at the Battle of Sahagún on 21 December 1808 and the Battle of Benavente on 29th. Part of the Queen's Own was shipped home in the Dispatch, which was wrecked just south of the Lizard on 22 January 1809; 104 men were lost from the regiment, only seven in total were saved. The unit returned to the Peninsula in August 1813 and made several charges at the February 1814 Battle of Orthez, Wellington reporting that the 7th Hussars distinguished themselves on this occasion and made many prisoners. In March 1814, the unit moved to Brighton, where it was used to put down rioting caused by the imposition of the Corn Laws. When Napoleon was restored in 1815, the regiment returned to the Netherlands; during the rearguard action at Genappe on 17 June, Lord Uxbridge ordered it to attack French lancers under Colonel Jean Baptiste Joseph Sourd. The following day, at the Battle of Waterloo, the regiment was held in reserve until the evening, but then again undertook a series of charges. Standish O'Grady, then a lieutenant in the 7th Hussars, wrote to his father:

"We charged twelve or fourteen times, and once cut off a squadron of cuirassiers, every man of whom we killed on the spot except the two officers and one Marshal de Logis, whom I sent to the rear".

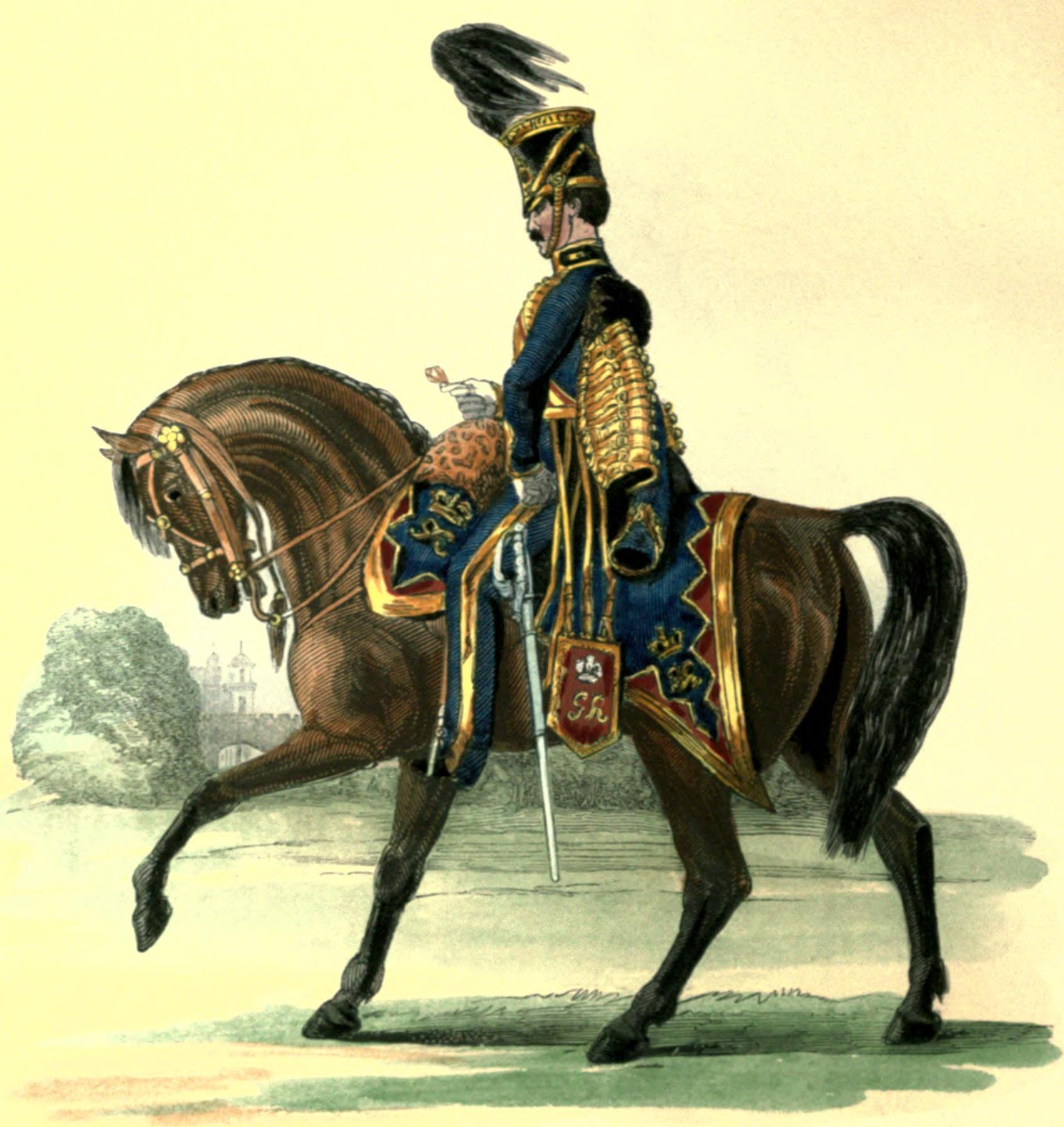
A regimental officer in 1840

In May 1838 the regiment was deployed to Canada as part of the response to the Lower Canada Rebellion.

=== Indian Rebellion of 1857 ===
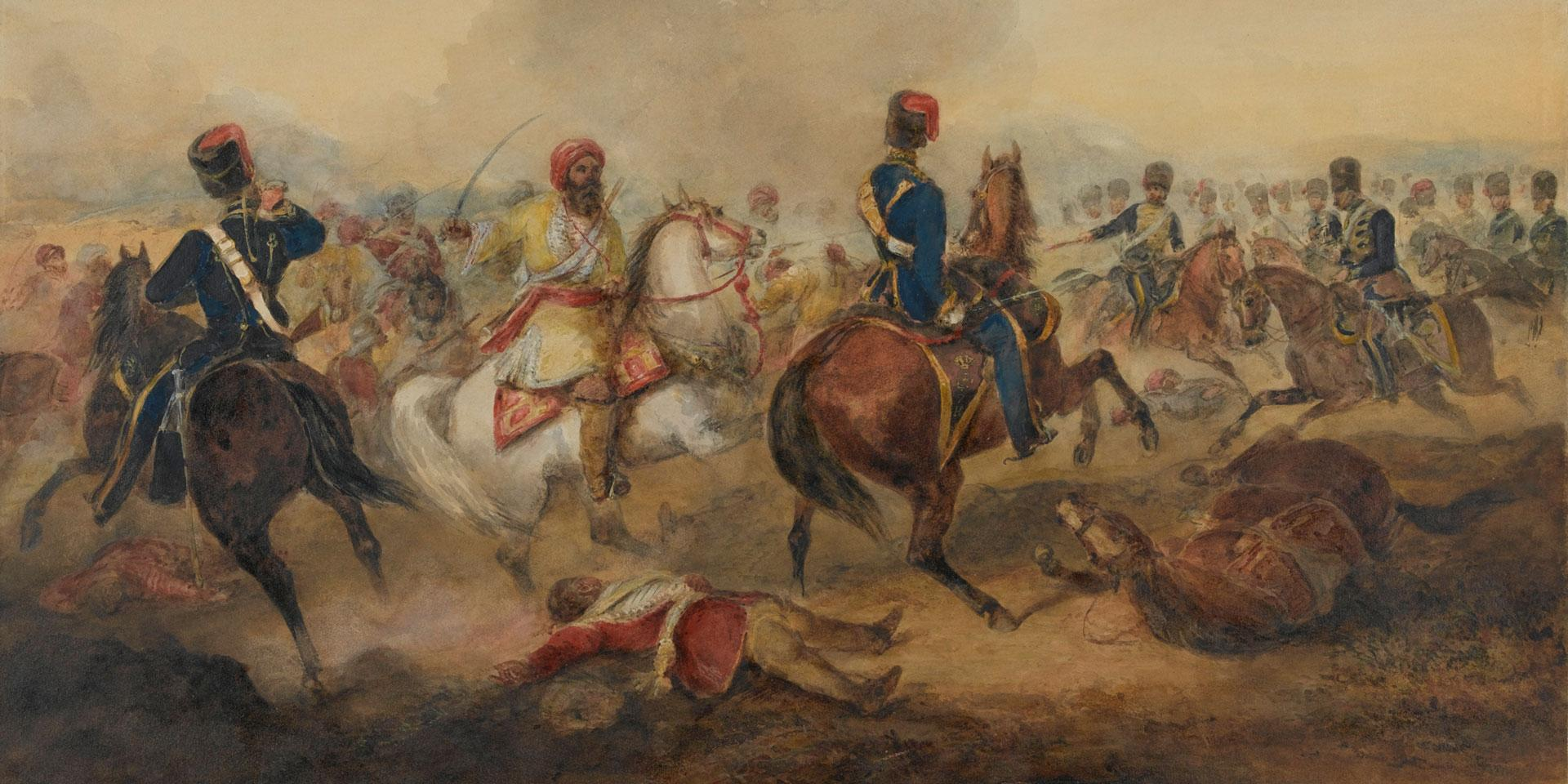
Regimental troops charging mounted mutineers during the Indian Rebellion

The regiment was deployed to India in late 1857 to suppress the Indian Rebellion of 1857. Cornet William George Hawtry Bankes died fighting off Indian rebels at Musa Bagh in March 1858 and Major Charles Craufurd Fraser saved three non-swimmers from the regiment stranded in the middle of a sandbank on the West Rapti River in December 1858. The regiment's title was simplified in 1861 as the 7th (Queen's Own) Hussars.

The regiment provided a contingent for the Nile Expedition in autumn 1884. The regiment was deployed to South Africa in November 1901 and was stationed at Leeuwkop during the Second Boer War.

=== First World War ===
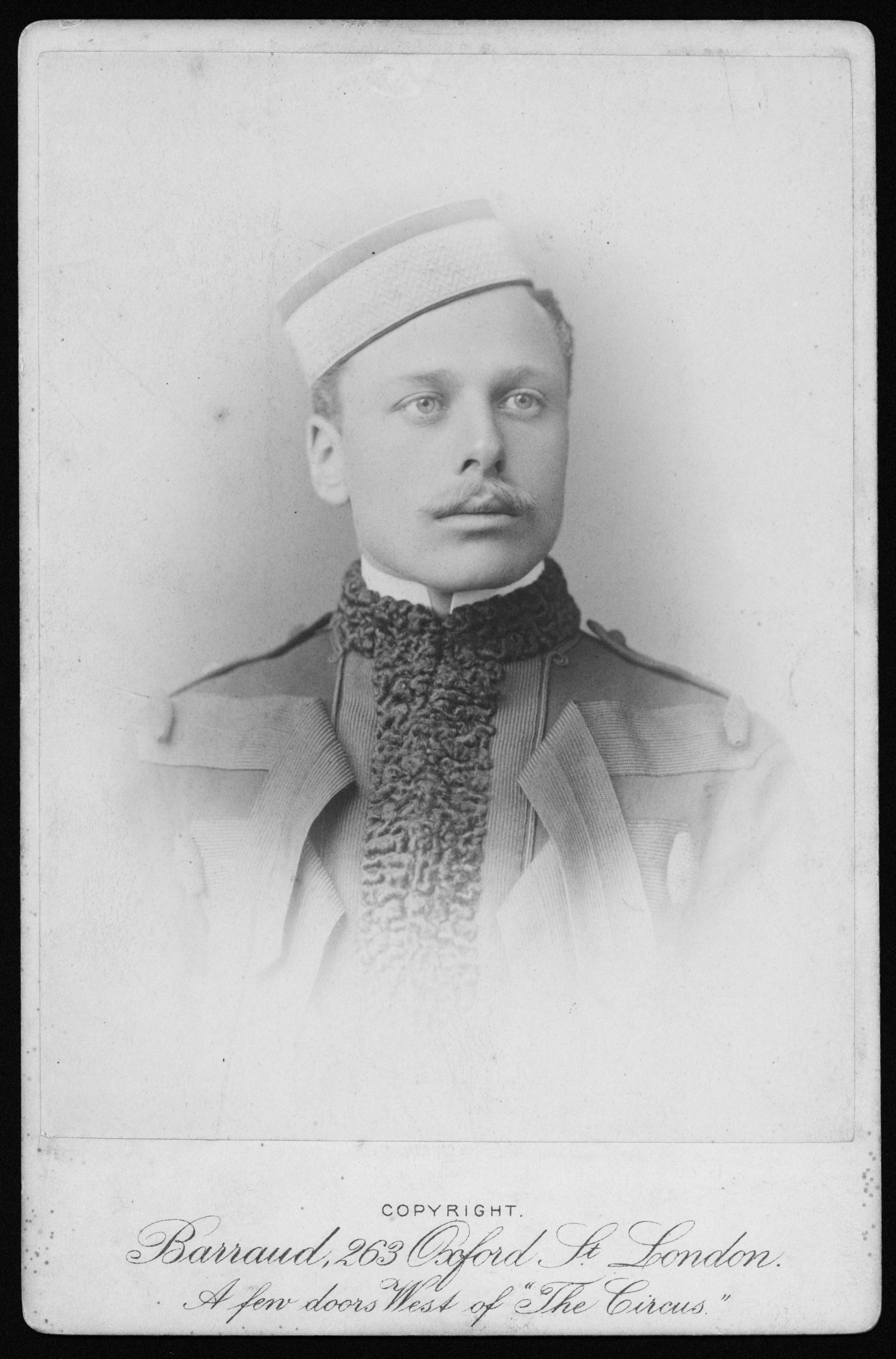
Douglas Haig as a regimental lieutenant, 1885

The regiment, which had been stationed in Bangalore at the start of the First World War landed in Mesopotamia as part of the 11th Indian Cavalry Brigade in November 1917. The regiment took part in the action of Khan Baghdadi in March 1918 and the Battle of Sharqat in October 1918. After service in the First World War, the regiment retitled as 7th Queen's Own Hussars in 1921. The regiment, which was re-equipped with Mark II tanks, transferred to the Royal Armoured Corps in 1939.

=== Second World War ===
The regiment had been converted to tanks in 1937 and subsequently been trained in Cairo giving them a reasonable advantage. Although they might have thought that they were misplaced in Egypt, when Italy entered the war on 10 June 1940, that thought quickly slipped their mind. They formed part of the 7th Armoured Brigade in the 7th Armoured Division and were joined by the 8th and the 11th Hussars. On 14 June 1940 the 7th Hussars, with a company of the King's Royal Rifle Corps and a battery of 4th Royal Horse artillery captured Fort Capuzzo, while the 11th Hussars captured La Maddalena. They took part in the Battle of Sidi Barrani in December 1940 and at the Battle of Bardia in January 1941. Hitler created the Afrika Korps under the command of General Erwin Rommel to re-inforce the Italians: in April 1941, the allied troops in Tobruk were cut off by the Germans and Italians but in June 1941 the 7th Armoured Division was again prepared for battle as part of Operation Battleaxe, having received new tanks and additional personnel. Rommel then started to push the Allies back into Egypt. The regiment helped delay Rommel's advance although the commanding officer Lieutenant Colonel Freddie Byass and many others were killed at the Battle of Sidi Rezegh in November 1941.

In January 1942 the regiment was sent to Burma and engaged with the Japanese Army at Pegu. Field Marshal Sir Harold Alexander spoke highly of the regiment when he said:

"Without them we should never have got the Army out of Burma; no praise can be too high for them."

The regiment was ordered to destroy its tanks as it crossed the Chindwin River in May 1942. It then re-deployed to the Italian Front and, having been seconded to the Polish 2nd Corps, fought at the first Battle of Ancona in June 1944 and in the battles for the Gothic Line in autumn 1944. The Polish Army granted the regiment the privilege of wearing the "Maid of Warsaw" for their "Magnificent work – fine examples of heroism and successful action".

The regiment reached Bologna in October 1944 and then took part in the battle for the Po plains in the spring of 1945.

=== Post-war ===
The regiment was deployed to Bournemouth Barracks in Soltau, in Northern Germany in June 1946. It returned to the UK in December 1947 and then moved to Alma Barracks in Lüneburg in 1949 and to Lumsden Barracks in Bad Fallingbostel in October 1951. The regiment was sent to Hong Kong in 1954 and returned home in 1957. It survived the immediate post-war reduction in forces, but was slated for reduction in the 1957 Defence White Paper, and was amalgamated with the 3rd The King's Own Hussars, to form the Queen's Own Hussars in 1958.

== Regimental museum ==
The regimental collection is located in Warwick in an area known as "Trinity Mews"

== Battle honours ==
The regiment's battle honours were as follows:

- Early wars: Dettingen, Warburg, Beaumont, Willems, Orthes, Peninsula, Waterloo, Lucknow, South Africa 1901-02
- The Great War: Khan Baghdadi, Sharqat, Mesopotamia 1917-18
- The Second World War: Egyptian Frontier 1940, Beda Fomm, Sidi Rezegh 1941, North Africa 1940–41, Ancona, Rimini Line, Italy 1944–45, Pegu, Paungde, Burma 1942

=== Victoria Crosses ===
- Lieutenant General Sir Charles Craufurd Fraser
- Cornet William George Hawtry Bankes

== Regimental Colonels ==
The regimental colonels were as follows:

The Queen's Own Regiment of Dragoons - (1690)

- 1690–1696: Brig-Gen. Richard Cunningham
- 1696–1707: Lt-Gen. William Kerr, 2nd Marquess of Lothian, KT (Lord Jedburgh)
- 1707–1709: Col. Patrick Hume, Baron Polwarth
- 1709–1714: Lt-Gen. Hon. William Kerr
- disbanded 1714

The Princess of Wales's Own Regiment of Dragoons - (reformed 1715)

- 1715–1741: Lt-Gen. Hon. William Kerr (reappointed)

The Queen's Own Regiment of Dragoons - (1727)

- 1741–1760: Lt-Gen. Sir John Cope, KB

7th (The Queen's Own) Regiment of Dragoons - (1751)

- 1760–1763: Gen. John Mostyn
- 1763–1779: F.M. Sir George Howard, KB
- 1779–1795: Gen. Sir Henry Clinton, KB (senior)

7th (or Queen's Own) Regiment of (Light) Dragoons - (1783)

- 1795–1801: Gen. Sir David Dundas, GCB
- 1801–1842: F.M. Henry William Paget, 1st Marquess of Anglesey, KG, GCB, GCH

7th (The Queen's Own) Regiment of (Light) Dragoons (Hussars) - (1807)

- 1842–1846: Lt-Gen. Sir James Kearney, KCH
- 1846–1864: Gen. Sir William Tuyll, KCH

7th (Queen's Own) Hussars - (1861)

- 1864: Gen. James Alexander St. Clair Erskine, 3rd Earl of Rosslyn
- 1866–1873: Maj-Gen. Sir John Scott, KCB
- 1873–1879: Col. Charles Hagart, CB
- 1879–1884: Gen. Henry Roxby Benson, CB
- 1884–1896: Lt-Gen. William Thomas Dickson
- 1896–1907: Maj-Gen. Robert Hale
- 1907–1924: Maj-Gen. Sir Hugh McCalmont, KCB, CVO

7th Queen's Own Hussars - (1921)

- 1924–1946: Maj-Gen. Alexander Augustus Frederick William Alfred George Cambridge, 1st Earl of Athlone, KG, PC, GCB, GCMG, GCVO, DSO, ADC
- 1946–1948: Col. Geoffrey Fielden, OBE
- 1948–1952: Col. Thomas Anson Thornton, CVO
- 1952–1958: Maj-Gen. Ralph Younger, CB, CBE, DSO, MC
- 1958 Amalgamated with 3rd The King's Own Hussars to form the Queen's Own Hussars

== See also ==
- British cavalry during the First World War

== Bibliography ==
- Anon. A Short History of the Seventh Queen's Own Hussars from 1689 to 1932. Gale & Polden Ltd. Aldershot. 1932.
- Barrett, C. R. B. (1914). The 7th (Queen's Own) Hussars. Vol. (2 vols). London: Royal United Services Institution.
- Brereton, J. M. (1975). The 7th Queen's Own Hussars. Barnsley: Leo Cooper.
- Cannon, Richard; Parker, John W. (2017) [1842]. Historical Records of the Seventh or The Queen's Own Regiment of Hussars. London. ISBN 9780665483752.
- Davy, G. M. O. Brig (1953). The Seventh and the Three Enemies: The Story of World War II and the 7th Queen's Own Hussars. Cambridge: W. Heffer & Sons Ltd.
- Evans, Roger (1965). The Years Between, The Story of the 7th Queen's Own Hussars 1911–1937. Aldershot: Gale & Polden Ltd.
- Gossett, William Patrick (1986). The lost ships of the Royal Navy, 1793-1900. London: Mansell. ISBN 0-7201-1816-6.
- Perry, F.W. (1993). Order of Battle of Divisions Part 5B. Indian Army Divisions. Newport: Ray Westlake Military Books. ISBN 1-871167-23-X.
- Playfair, Major General I.S.O. (2004) [1956]. The Mediterranean and Middle East Volume 2: The Germans Come to the Help of Their Ally, 1941. History of the Second World War, United Kingdom Military Series. East Sussex, UK: Naval & Military Press. pp. 406 pages. ISBN 1-84574-066-1.
- Wit, Pierre de (26 July 2011) [2005], "The action near Genappe" (PDF), The campaign of 1815: a study, Emmen, the Netherlands
