= César Alexandre Debelle =

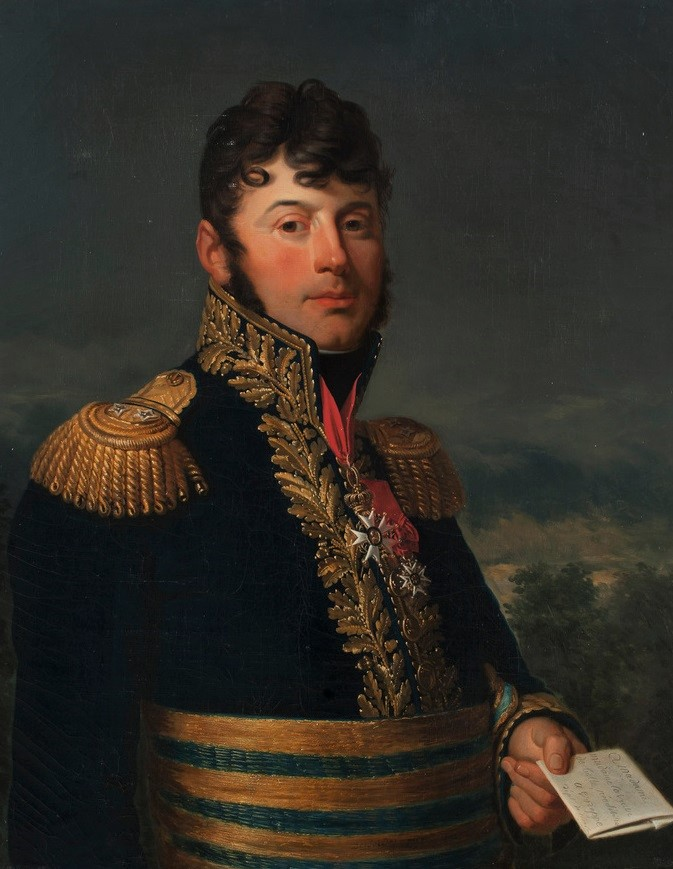
César Alexandre Debelle

César Alexandre Debelle (French pronunciation: [sezaʁ alɛksɑ̃dʁ dəbɛl]; Voreppe, Isère, 27 November 1770 – 19 July 1826) was a French general. He was created a baron of the Empire in 1808. He was the cavalry brigade commander at the Battle of Sahagún, where his force was heavily defeated by British hussars under Henry, Lord Paget. His name is inscribed on the north side of the Arc de Triomphe. His brother Jean-François Joseph Debelle was also a general.

== Sources ==
- Mullié, Charles (1852). "Debelle de Gachetière (César-Alexandre, baron)" . Biographie des célébrités militaires des armées de terre et de mer de 1789 à 1850 (in French). Paris: Poignavant et Compagnie.
