= Jean-François Joseph Debelle =

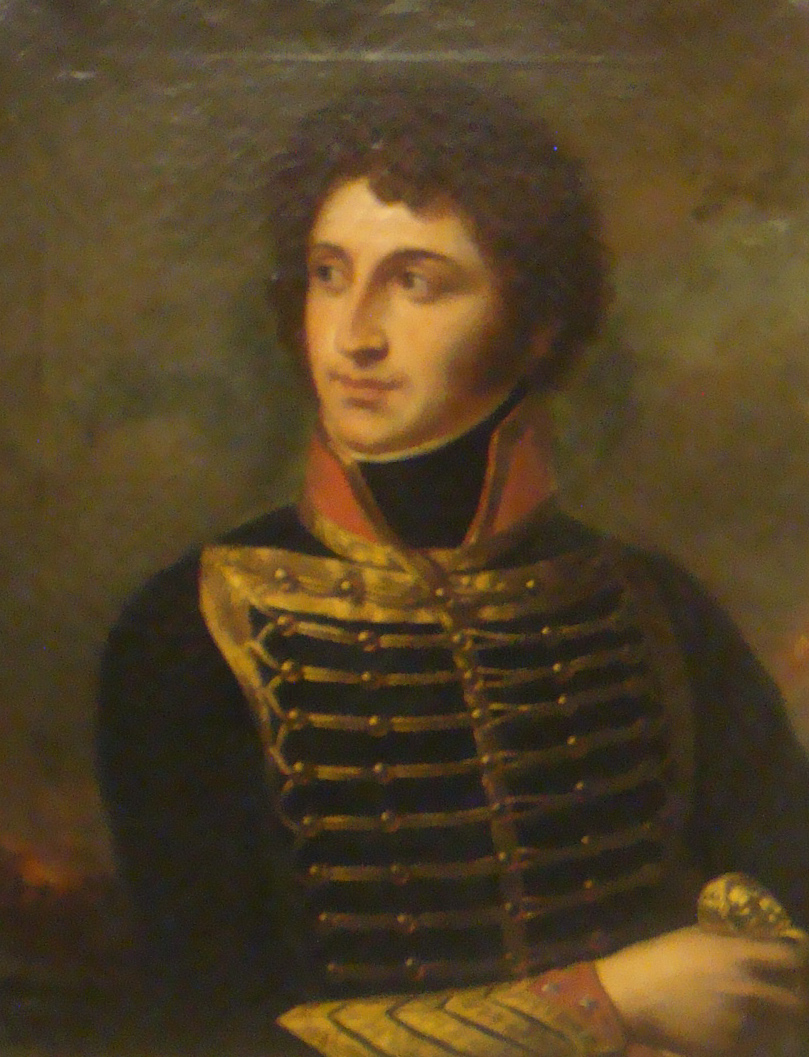
Jean-François Joseph Debelle; portrait by Pierre-Joseph Dedreux-Dorcy (1837)

Jean-François Joseph Debelle (22 May 1767, in Voreppe, Isère – 15 June 1802, in Saint-Raphaël) was a French general and soldier.

He fought at the Battle of Fleurus (as a brevet général de brigade). In 1796 he held command of the artillery of the Army of Sambre and Meuse and was granted command of the artillery attached to the expedition to Ireland. He headed the Armée d'Italie's artillery in its retreat to France after the Battle of Novi, and participated in the Saint-Domingue expedition, on which he died aged 34 of yellow fever. On 10 March his father was granted a pension of 1,500 francs, which passed to Debelle's widow on his death. Debelle is one of the names inscribed under the Arc de Triomphe, on Column 6 of the north pillar. He was a friend and brother-in-law to general Lazare Hoche and the brother to general César Alexandre Debelle.
