= Merlynn Newbold =

American politician

Member of the Utah House of Representatives from the 50th district
- In office January 1, 2001 – December 31, 2012
- Succeeded by: Rich Cunningham

Personal details
- Born: June 11, 1950 (age 75) Salt Lake City, Utah
- Party: Republican

Merlynn Newbold (born June 11, 1950) is an American politician who served in the Utah House of Representatives from the 50th district from 2001 to 2012.
