= Rick Cunningham =

Rick Cunningham may refer to:

- Rick Cunningham (American football) (born 1967), American football player
- Rick Cunningham (ice hockey) (born 1951), ice hockey player
- Rick Cunnhingham (runner) (born c. 1943), American middle-distance runner, 1965 NCAA indoor mile runner-up for the Miami RedHawks track and field team

== See also ==
- Richard Cunningham (disambiguation)
