= Military General Service Medal =

- Obverse and reverse of the medal
- Type: Campaign medal
- Awarded for: Campaign service
- Description: Silver disk, 36mm diameter
- Presented by: United Kingdom of Great Britain and Ireland
- Eligibility: British Army
- Campaigns: French Revolutionary and Napoleonic Wars 1793–1814, Anglo-American War of 1812
- Clasps: 29 authorised
- Established: 1 June 1847
- Total: 26,091
- Ribbon: 32mm, crimson edged with dark blue

The Military General Service Medal (MGSM) was a campaign medal approved in 1847 and issued to officers and men of the British Army in 1848. (Note: About 40 awards were made to officers and men of the Royal Navy and Royal Marines, on attachment to the army.) (Note: Including officers and men of the King's German Legion, Brunswick Oels and Chasseurs Britanniques, but not other foreign troops in British service.)

The MGSM was approved on 1 June 1847 as a retrospective award for various military actions from 1793–1814; a period encompassing the French Revolutionary Wars, the Napoleonic Wars, and the Anglo-American War of 1812. Each battle or campaign covered by the medal was represented by a clasp on the ribbon; twenty-nine were sanctioned and the maximum awarded to one man was fifteen. (Note: Two men were awarded medals with fifteen clasps, twelve with fourteen clasps and forty-four with thirteen clasps.)

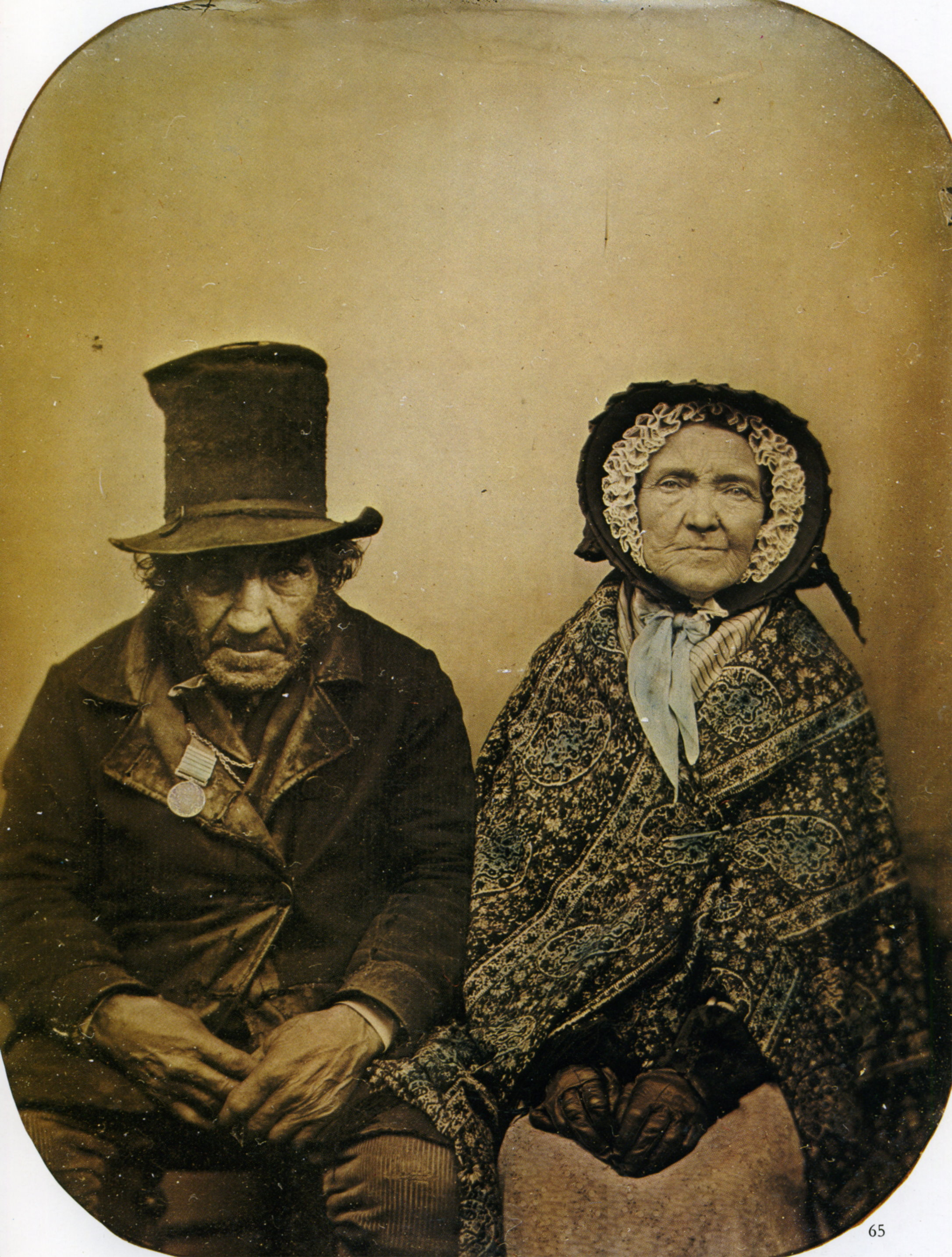
Ambrotype of an unknown English Peninsular War 1807–1814 veteran and his wife taken possibly 1860. His Military General Service Medal has six campaign clasps.

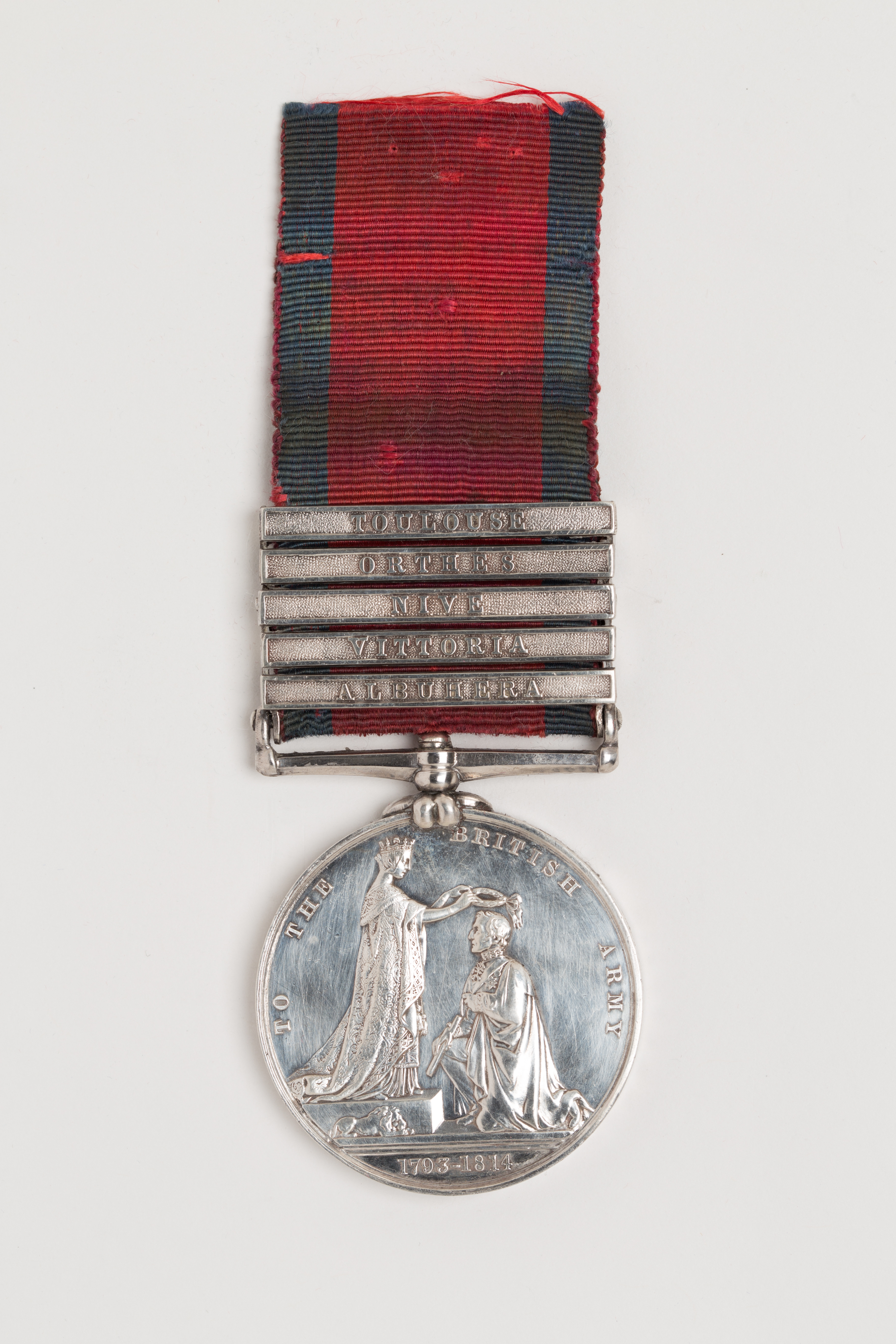
Five bar medal awarded to Richard Butler, 13th Light Dragoons

The Duke of Richmond, who had fought at Waterloo, was chiefly responsible for the belated institution of the Military General Service Medal for all survivors of the campaigns between 1793 and 1814. He campaigned in Parliament and also enlisted the interest of Queen Victoria, who persuaded a reluctant Duke of Wellington that junior and non-commissioned officers and private soldiers deserved this recognition. (Note: It was awarded to those who were junior officers during the period 1793–1814. James Holmes Schoedde (14 clasps) had been a captain in the 60th by 1814, but eventually became a lieutenant general.) Hitherto, only the Waterloo Medal had been awarded to all ranks, while senior officers could receive the Army Gold Medal for service in the Napoleonic Wars.

The MGSM was only awarded to surviving claimants. A combination of factors, including general illiteracy and limited publicity for the new medal, meant that many did not apply for it, (Note: By 1847 the King's German Legion, Brunswick Oels and Chasseurs Britanniques had been disbanded and the men had returned home to the German states; few were aware that they were entitled to the medal.) with only about 10 percent of those who served receiving the medal. While next of kin could not apply for a medal on behalf of a deceased relative, they did receive the medal in cases where the claimant had died between their application and actual award.

A total of 26,089 medals were awarded. (Note: Joslin states '25,650 applications for the medal', the discrepancy probably due to late claims.)

This medal and its naval counterpart, the Naval General Service Medal, were among the first real British campaign medals, issued to all ranks present at a battle or campaign. The earlier Army Gold Medal had been awarded to field and general officers for their successful commands; they were not eligible to claim clasps for the same battle on the MGSM. To distinguish between the two medals, the MGSM was referred to as the "silver medal".

== Appearance ==
The medal, designed by William Wyon, is of silver and 1.4 inches (36 mm) in diameter.

- Obverse: a left facing effigy of Queen Victoria with the inscription "VICTORIA REGINA" and the date "1848".
- Reverse: Queen Victoria standing on a dais, crowning a kneeling Duke of Wellington with a laurel wreath. Above is the inscription "TO THE BRITISH ARMY", with the dates "1793–1814" below.
- Naming: The name and regiment of the recipient is impressed on the rim in block Roman capitals.
- The 1.25 inches (32 mm) wide ribbon is crimson, with dark blue edges, the 'military ribbon' previously used for the Army Gold Medal and Cross and the Waterloo Medal.

== Clasps ==
The following clasps were awarded. Although the medal bears the dates 1793 to 1814, no clasp was authorised for service before 1801, or between 1802 and 1805. A total of 21 clasps relate to the Peninsular War and three to the War of 1812. The medal was never issued without a clasp. The most awarded to a single recipient was 15.

- Egypt (Clasp authorised in 1850)
- Maida
- Roleia
- Vimiera
- Sahagun
- Benevente
- Sahagun and Benevente (If present at both actions)
- Corunna
- Martinique
- Talavera
- Guadaloupe
- Busaco
- Barrosa
- Fuentes D'Onor
- Albuhera
- Java
- Ciudad Rodrigo
- Badajoz
- Salamanca
- Fort Detroit
- Vittoria
- Pyrenees
- St Sebastien
- Chateauguay
- Nivelle
- Chrysler's Farm
- Nive
- Orthes
- Toulouse

== Bibliography ==
- Collett, D. W. (1981). Brant, J. G. (ed.). Medals Yearbook. London, UK: Medals Year Book.
- Dorling, H. Taprell (1956). Ribbons and Medals. London, UK: A. H. Baldwin & Son. OCLC 930416375.
- Johnson, Stanley C. (1921). A Guide to Naval, Military, Air-force and Civil Medals and Ribbons. London, UK: H. Jenkins.
- Joslin, E. C.; Litherland, A. R.; Simpkin, B. T., eds. (1988). British Battles and Medals. London, UK: Spink. ISBN 0-907605-25-7.
- Mayo, John Horsley (1897). Medals and Decorations of the British Army and Navy. A. Constable & Co.
- Mussell, J. W., ed. (2015). Medals Yearbook 2016. Honiton, Devon: Token Publishing. ISBN 978-1-9088-2824-8.
