= Haggart =

Haggart may refer to:

- Alastair Haggart, British priest
- Alexander Haggart (1848–1927), Canadian judge and politician
- Bob Haggart (1914–1998), American musician
- David Haggart (1801–1821), Scottish criminal
- George Haggart, Scottish curler
- John Graham Haggart (1836–1913), Canadian politician

== See also ==
- Hagart (disambiguation)
