= Charles Hagart =

British Army officer (1814–1879)

- Born: 23 June 1814; Edinburgh, Scotland
- Died: 30 July 1879 (aged 65); Eastbury Manor, Compton, Guildford
- Burial place: Eastbury Manor Family Burial Ground
- Military career
- Allegiance: United Kingdom
- Branch: British Army
- Rank: Colonel
- Unit: 7th Hussars
- Conflicts: Indian Rebellion
- Awards: Companion of the Order of the Bath

Colonel Charles Hagart CB (23 June 1814 – 30 July 1879) was a British Army officer.

== Career ==
Hagart was commissioned as an ensign in the 7th (The Queen's Own) Regiment of (Light) Dragoons (Hussars) on 15 June 1832. Promoted to lieutenant-colonel on 31 October 1851 on appointment as commanding officer of the 7th (The Queen's Own) Regiment of (Light) Dragoons (Hussars), he commanded the regiment until August 1857.

His brother James McCaul Hagart was also Lieutenant Colonel at the time (having been commissioned as ensign on 26 May 1837), and took over command of the regiment following Charles.

He then commanded the 1st Cavalry Brigade in the operations beyond the River Goomtee, at the siege of Alleegunge, and the captures of Ruyaghur, Snabjebanpore, Bareilly, and Mohumdee. In the autumn of the same year was attached to the Oude field force, and commanded the Cavalry of that Division at the occupation of Fyzabad, passage of the Gogrs, and during the whole Trans-Gogra campaign until the end of the war in 1859.

He became regimental colonel of the 7th (The Queen's Own) Regiment of (Light) Dragoons (Hussars) in 1873.
