= Army Gold Medal =

British campaign medal

Army Gold Medal and Cross
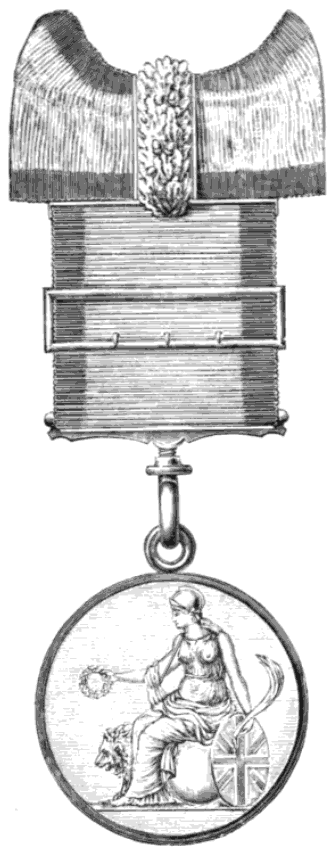
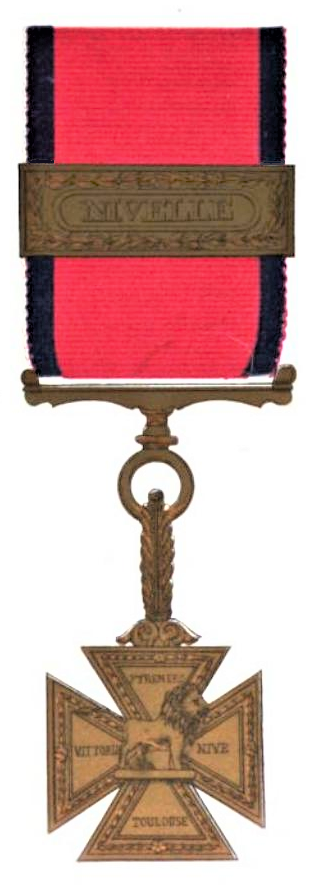
- Gold Medal and Gold Cross with clasp, both obverse
- Type: Campaign medal
- Awarded for: Campaign commands (conspicuous service)
- Description: Medal: obverse Britannia with shield, laurel wreath and palm branch reverse name of first battle awarded, with laurel wreath Cross: cross pattée with proud lion, battle names on arms Clasps: laurel wreath with battle name Ribbon: broad crimson with blue border
- Presented by: United Kingdom of Great Britain and Ireland
- Eligibility: British Army field and general officers
- Campaigns: French Revolutionary and Napoleonic Wars 1793–1814, Anglo-American War of 1812.
- Clasps: 27 authorised
- Established: 1810
- Ribbon

The Army Gold Medal (1808–1814), also known as the Peninsular Gold Medal, with an accompanying Gold Cross, was a British campaign medal awarded in recognition of field and general officers' successful commands in campaigns, predominantly the Peninsular War. It was not a general medal, since it was issued only to officers whose status was no less than that of battalion commander or equivalent.

== Background ==
Naval Gold Medals had been awarded since 1794 to captains and admirals who had served in specified successful naval actions, with admirals' medals being larger. In 1806, a special gold medal was presented to British Army majors and above who had taken a key part in the Battle of Maida. This medal, 1.5 inches (38 mm) in diameter, shows the profile of King George III on the obverse with a reverse design incorporating Britannia and the Sicilian triskeles.

A general campaign medal for the Napoleonic Wars, awarded to all British troops irrespective of rank, would only be established in 1847.

== Awards ==
The Army Gold Medal was established in 1810 to reward service in Napoleonic War battles since 1808. Like the Maida Gold Medal, it was awarded only to majors and above and, like the Naval Gold Medal, it was awarded in two sizes, with the larger to senior officers.

When the Army Gold Medal was first established, a new one was issued for each action. In October 1813, to prevent a proliferation of awards to one recipient, an order was created instructing that only one medal be worn, with a ribbon clasp denoting the battle concerned for any further award. The fourth award was to be marked by a Gold Cross, replacing the earlier medals, with the names of each of the four battles on the arms of the cross. Again, clasps for attachment to the ribbon of the cross were presented for any successive awards.

The award could be made posthumously, and sent to the officer's family.

The total number awarded were:

	Number awarded	Clasps awarded
Large Gold Medal	88 medals	43 clasps
Small Gold Medal	596 medals	237 clasps
Gold Cross	163 crosses	241 clasps

=== Six or more clasps ===
The highest award was earned by the Duke of Wellington: a Cross with nine bars for a total of 13 actions. It can be viewed on his uniform in the basement at Apsley House.

Officer	Clasps	Battles
Arthur Wellesley, 1st Duke of Wellington	13	Roleia & Vimiera, Talavera, Busaco, Fuentes D'Onor, Ciudad Rodrigo, Badajoz, Salamanca, Vittoria, Pyrenees, Nivelle, Nive, Orthes, Toulouse
William Beresford, 1st Viscount Beresford	7	Corunna, Busaco, Albuhera, Badajoz, Salamanca, Vittoria, Pyrenees, Nivelle, Nive, Orthes, Toulouse
Sir Denis Pack	7	Roleia & Vimiera, Corunna, Busaco, Ciudad Rodrigo, Salamanca, Vittoria, Pyrenees, Nivelle, Nive, Orthes, Toulouse
Sir Colin Campbell	6	Talavera, Busaco, Fuentes D'Onor, Badajoz, Salamanca, Vittoria, Pyrenees, Nivelle, Nive, Toulouse
Sir Alexander Dickson	6	Busaco, Albuhera, Ciudad Rodrigo, Badajoz, Salamanca, Vittoria, San Sebastián, Nivelle, Nive, Toulouse
Sir George Murray	6	Corunna, Talavera, Busaco, Fuentes D'Onor, Vittoria, Pyrenees, Nivelle, Nive, Orthes, Toulouse

== Appearance ==
The medal came in three styles, laid out below:

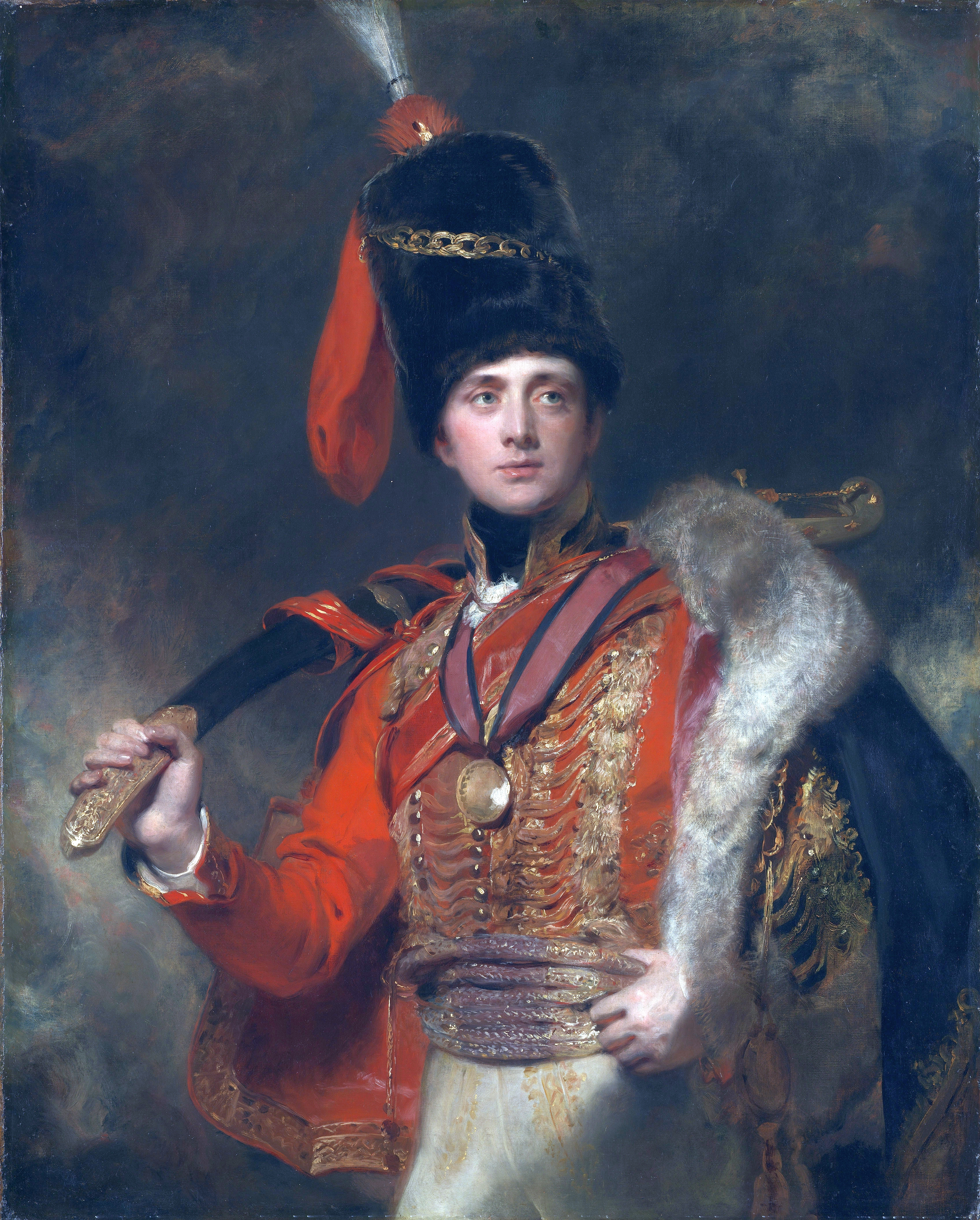
The Marquess of Londonderry by Thomas Lawrence wearing the Large Gold Medal

The Large Gold Medal, was restricted to general officers.
The medal was 2.12 inches (54 mm) in diameter, and mounted in a gold frame, glazed on both sides.
Obverse: Britannia with shield, seated and facing left and holding a laurel wreath in her right hand and a palm branch in her left. Behind her, the head of a lion can be seen.
Reverse: A laurel wreath surround, with the name of the battle engraved in the centre, although that for Barrosa was die struck.
The medal was worn around the neck.
The designer was Thomas Wyon

The Small Gold Medal was awarded to officers between the rank of major and colonel.
The medal was 1.3 inches (33 mm) in diameter, mounted in a gold frame and glazed, and of the same design as the Large Medal.
It was worn on the left chest, often from a buttonhole, with the ribbon attached via a wide curved suspender.

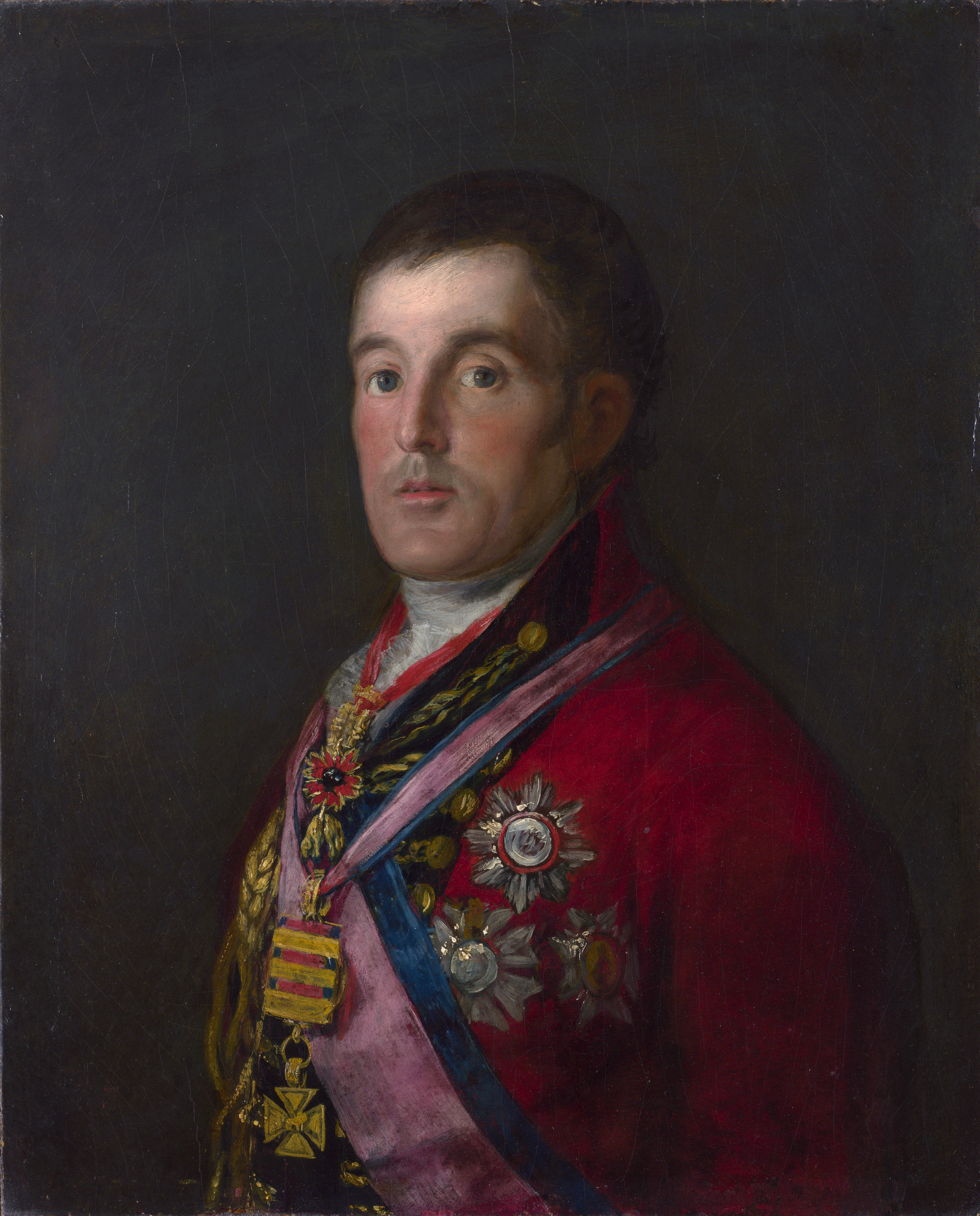
The Duke of Wellington wearing the Gold Cross with three clasps

The Gold (or Peninsular) Cross was awarded to those who earned four or more gold medals, which it replaced. Worn around the neck, it is an ornamental cross pattée 1.5 inches (38 mm) across, with a proud lion at its centre and the four qualifying actions embossed on its arms. The obverse and reverse are the same. Any further actions were marked with a clasp.
The medal was worn around the neck with the ribbon attached via an ornate loop on top of the cross which passes through a smaller simpler ring below a straight suspender.
The designer was Thomas Wyon.

The Clasps were of a common pattern for all awards, with the name of the battle within a wide laurel wreath frame.

The Ribbon for all the awards was broad crimson with blue borders, 1.75 inches (44 mm) wide. This ribbon design had been used for the Maida Gold Medal and would later be used for the Waterloo and the Military General Service Medals and the Distinguished Service Order.

Naming. All awards had the name of the recipient engraved on the rim.

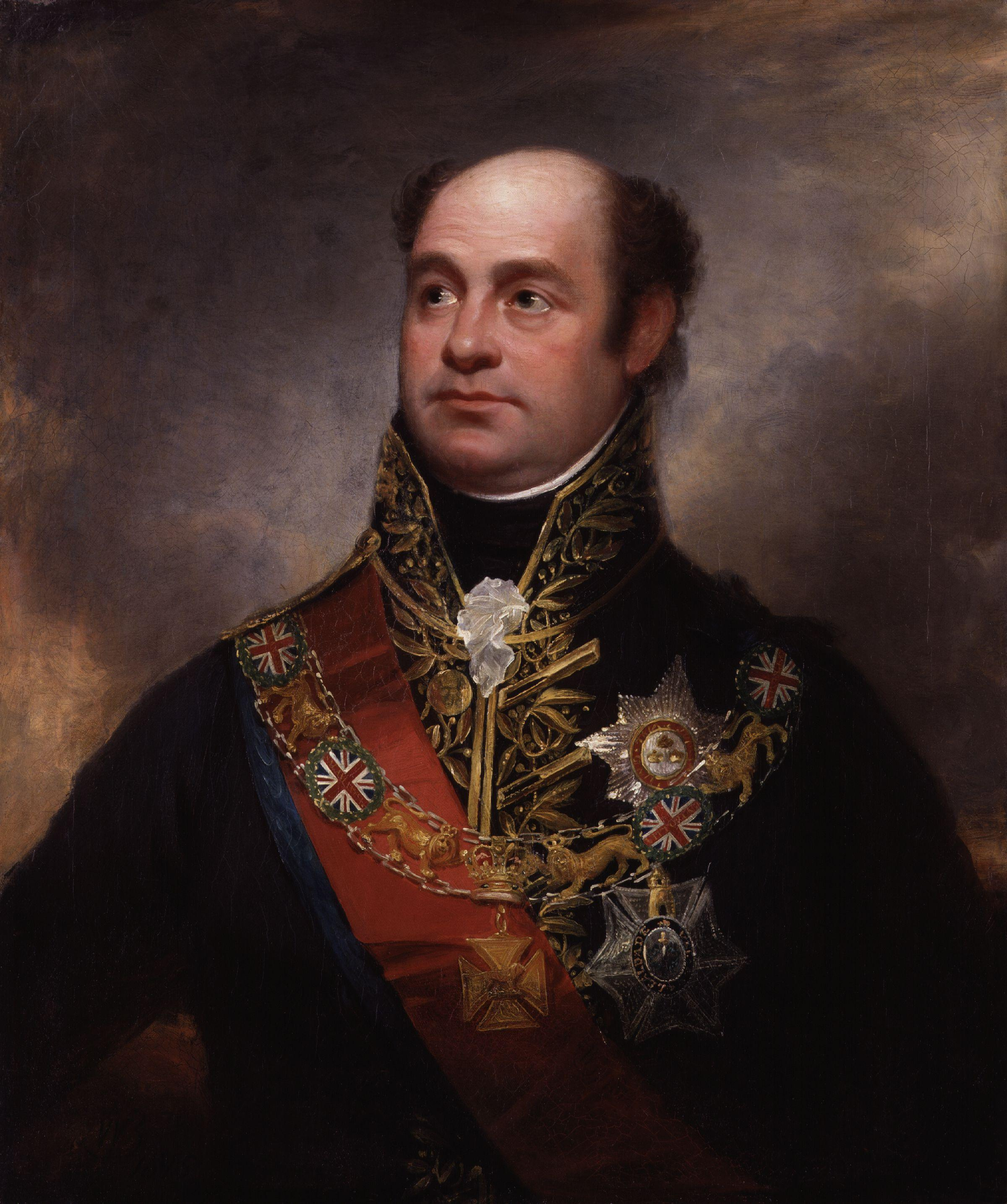
Portrait of Lord Beresford by William Beechey. Beresford wears the Gold Collar and Cross

A Gold Collar and Cross was awarded to Duke of Wellington and to Viscount Beresford. This cross was of a similar design to the Army Gold Cross, but with a winged figure of Victory at its centre, with suspension from a chain of alternate lions and Union Flag oval medallions. The Gold Collar and Cross was a separate and additional award to the Army Gold Cross.

== Discontinuation ==
Following the Peninsular War, award of the gold medals and Crosses was discontinued when would-be recipients became eligible for Order of the Bath on its restructuring to three classes.

In 1847 the Military General Service Medal (MGSM) was authorised, to be retrospectively awarded to all surviving veterans of the campaigns, irrespective of rank. Holders of the gold medals, crosses or additional clasps were not eligible to claim identical clasps on the MGSM. The eligible battles and campaigns for the MGSM were identical, with the addition of Egypt.

The design of the cross is very similar to the later Victoria Cross and is considered to have provided the inspiration.

== Clasps ==
Awards, both medals and clasps, were made for the following 27 battles and campaigns:

- Roleia
- Vimiera
- Sahagun
- Benevente
- Sahagun and Benevente (If present at both actions)
- Corunna
- Martinique
- Talavera
- Guadaloupe
- Busaco
- Barrosa
- Fuentes D'Onor
- Albuhera
- Java
- Ciudad Rodrigo
- Badajoz
- Salamanca
- Fort Detroit
- Chateauguay
- Chrysler's Farm
- Vittoria
- Pyrenees
- St Sebastien
- Nivelle
- Nive
- Orthes
- Toulouse

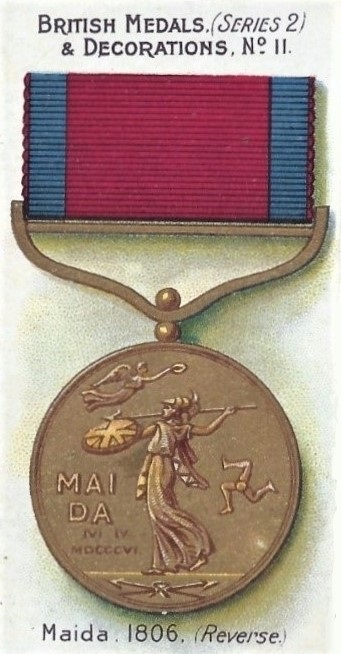
Gold Medal for the Battle of Maida, (4 July 1806), reverse

The Battle of Maida in 1806 was commemorated by a gold medal of different design. On the obverse is depicted the laureate profile of George III, with the legend "GEORGIUS TERTIUS REX" punctuated by a cluster of oak leaves. The reverse features Britannia with shield and spear raised, surrounding Britannia is the name Maida, the date 1806 in roman numerals, a Sicilian Triskel, and beneath Britannia are two crossed spears.

== See also ==
- Category:Recipients of the Army Gold Cross
- Category:Recipients of the Army Gold Medal
