= Rich Cunningham =

American politician

Member of the Utah House of Representatives from the 50th district
- In office January 1, 2013 – January 1, 2017
- Preceded by: Merlynn Newbold
- Succeeded by: Susan Pulsipher

Personal details
- Party: Republican
- Education: University of Utah; Indiana University of Pennsylvania; USU-College of Eastern Utah
- Profession: Financial adviser
- Website: richcunningham.org

Rich Cunningham is an American politician and was a Republican member of the Utah House of Representatives representing District 50 from January 1, 2013 to January 1, 2017.

== Early life and education ==
Cunningham attended the University of Utah, the Indiana University of Pennsylvania, and USU-College of Eastern Utah. He currently works as a financial services investment adviser and lives in South Jordan, Utah.

== Political career ==
2014 Cunningham defeated Louis Welch in the 2014 Republican convention and then defeated Democratic nominee Gabriel Morazan with 8,554 votes (77.6%) at the November 4, 2014 general election.

2012 Challenging District 50 incumbent Republican Representative Merlynn Newbold, Cunningham was selected by the Republican convention and won the November 6, 2012 general election with 13,508 votes (77.2%) against Democratic nominee Billie Larson.

During the 2016 legislative session, Cunningham served on the Executive Offices and Criminal Justice Appropriations Subcommittee, the House Retirement and Independent Entities Committee, the House Revenue and Taxation Committee as well as the House Transportation Committee.

== 2016 sponsored legislation ==
Bill number	Bill title	Status
HB0047	Postretirement Employment Rural and Title I School Exceptions	House/ filed - 3/10/2016
HB0050	Postretirement Reemployment Amendments	House/ filed - 3/10/2016
HB0086S03	Postretirement Employment Restrictions	House/ filed - 3/10/2016
HB0106	Securities Amendments	Governor Signed - 3/30/2016
HB0117	Modifications to Postretirement Reemployment Restrictions	House/ filed - 3/10/2016
HB0205	Tier II Retirement Amendments	House/ filed - 3/10/2016
HB0387	Utah Revised Business Corporate Act Amendments	House/ filed - 3/10/2016
HB0475	Driver License Amendments	House/ filed - 3/10/2016

Representative Cunningham did not floor sponsor any bills in 2016.
