= Battle of Benavente =

1808 battle of the Peninsular War

- Part of the Peninsular War
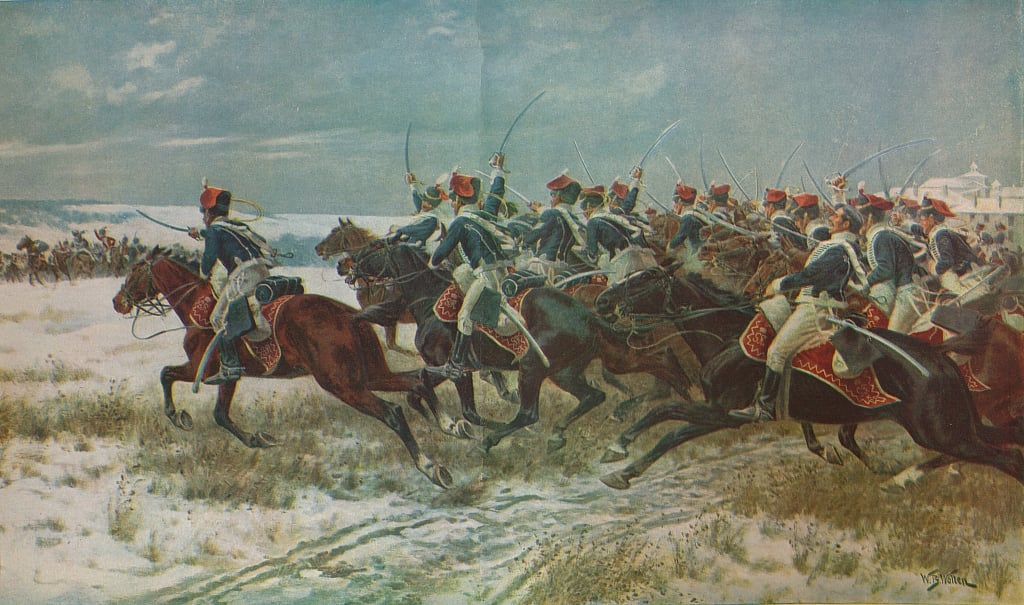
- 1910 painting of the battle
Date	29 December 1808
Location	Zamora, Spain 42.0031°N 5.6742°W
Result	British victory

Belligerents
(United Kingdom of Great Britain and Ireland) United Kingdom	(First French Empire) France

Commanders and leaders
(United Kingdom of Great Britain and Ireland) Henry, Lord Paget	(First French Empire) Charles Lefebvre-Desnouettes (POW)

Strength
600	550

Casualties and losses
50 killed or wounded	55 killed or wounded 73 captured

Peninsular War: Napoleon's invasion
current battle

The Battle of Benavente (29 December 1808) was a cavalry clash in which the British cavalry of Lord Paget defeated the elite Chasseurs à cheval (Mounted Chasseurs of the Imperial Guard) during the Corunna Campaign of the Peninsular War. The French chasseurs were broken and forced into the River Esla; their commanding officer, General Lefebvre-Desnouettes, was captured. The action was the first major incident in the British army's harrowing retreat to the coast and ultimate evacuation by sea.

== Background ==
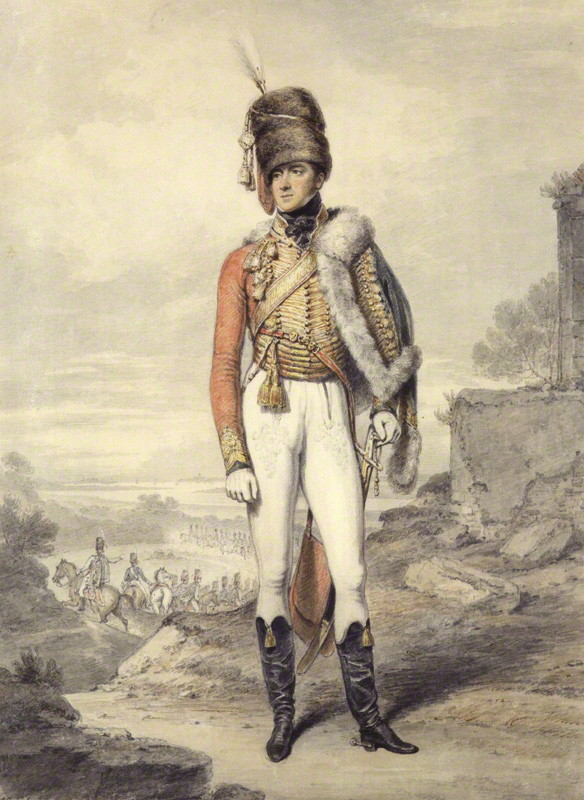
Henry, Lord Paget, commander of the British cavalry

Sir John Moore led a British army into the heart of northwestern Spain with the aim of aiding the Spanish in their struggle against the French occupation. However, Napoleon had entered Spain at the head of a large army in order to retrieve French fortunes. This, together with the fall of Madrid to the French, made the position of the British army untenable. The British army had begun their retreat and were being pursued by the main French army led by Napoleon himself; the cavalry under Henry, Lord Paget were performing an effective screening role to cover them. On Christmas Day the 10th Hussars had taken 100 enemy cavalrymen prisoner, and on 27 December the 18th Hussars had been attacked no less than six times, on each occasion they countercharged successfully. On the 28th the British cavalry were acting as a rearguard posted on the River Esla, to cover the army's withdrawal to Astorga.

Forces

The French force consisted of four squadrons of the Chasseurs, plus a number of Mamelukes of the Imperial Guard.

The British forces were drawn from the brigades of John Slade: 10th Hussars and the 18th Hussars and of Charles Stewart (later took the surname Vane): pickets of the 7th Hussars and 3rd Hussars of the King's German Legion (KGL).

== Battle ==
Outlying pickets of the British cavalry were stationed along the western bank of the River Esla, which was swollen with rain. The bridge at Castrogonzalo had been demolished by British engineers early on the 29th, and it was not until about 9:00 in the morning that Charles Lefebvre-Desnouettes, a noted favourite of Napoleon, was able to ford the river with three strong squadrons of his chasseurs and a small detachment of Mamelukes. The French forced the outlying pickets of the British cavalry back onto the inlying picket commanded by Loftus Otway (18th Hussars). Otway charged, despite heavy odds, but was driven back for 2 miles towards the town of Benavente. In an area where their flanks were covered by walls the British, now reinforced by a troop or squadron of the 3rd Hussars KGL and commanded by Brigadier-General Stewart, counter-attacked and a confused melee ensued. The French, though temporarily driven back, had superior numbers and forced the British hussars to retreat once more, almost back to Benavente. Stewart knew he was drawing the French towards Paget and substantial numbers of British reserves.

The French had gained the upper hand in the fight and were preparing to deliver a final charge when Lord Paget made a decisive intervention. He led the 10th Hussars, with squadrons of the 18th in support, around the southern outskirts of Benavente. Paget managed to conceal his squadrons from French view until he could fall on their left flank. The British swords, often dulled by their iron scabbards, were very sharp on this occasion. An eyewitness stated that he saw the arms of French troopers cut off cleanly "like Berlin sausages." Other French soldiers were killed by blows to the head, blows which divided the head down to the chin.

The French made a fighting withdrawal back to the river, though their squadrons were eventually broken and a running fight ensued. The chasseurs were forced into and across the river, those who were left on the western bank were either cut down or made prisoner. Lefebvre-Desnouettes' horse was injured and he could not cross the river; he was then made prisoner, either by Levi Grisdale of the 10th Hussars or Johann Bergmann of the King's German Legion hussars, opinions differed at the time. As the chasseurs swam their horses across the river the British troopers fired on them with their carbines and pistols. The French cavalry re-formed on their side of the river and opened carbine fire on the British, though they were subsequently dispersed by the fire of British horse artillery.

== Aftermath ==
The victory gained over the elite of the French light cavalry raised the morale of the British hussars; it underlined the ascendancy they had achieved over the French cavalry at the earlier Battle of Sahagún. The retreat of the British army, however, continued with the Battle of Mansilla and the Battle of Cacabelos as part of the Corunna campaign. Napoleon had viewed the action from a height overlooking the river; his reactions were rather muted and he made light of the losses to, and humbling of, his "Cherished Children." That evening Lefebvre-Desnouettes, who had suffered a superficial head wound, was entertained at the table of the British commander-in-chief Sir John Moore; Moore gave him his own sword to replace the one taken when he surrendered.

Lefebvre-Desnouettes was imprisoned in England where he eventually broke his parole, an unpardonable sin according to English public opinion, and escaped back to France, whereupon Napoleon reinstated him to his former command of the guard chasseurs. Within the social code of the time a "gentleman", when giving his parole, pledged his honour not to escape. In return for this he was not incarcerated and allowed very considerable freedoms. According to this code, when he escaped, Lefebvre-Desnouettes dishonoured himself. In addition, Napoleon became a party to the dishonour when he did not send Lefebvre-Desnouettes back to face imprisonment.

== Gallery ==
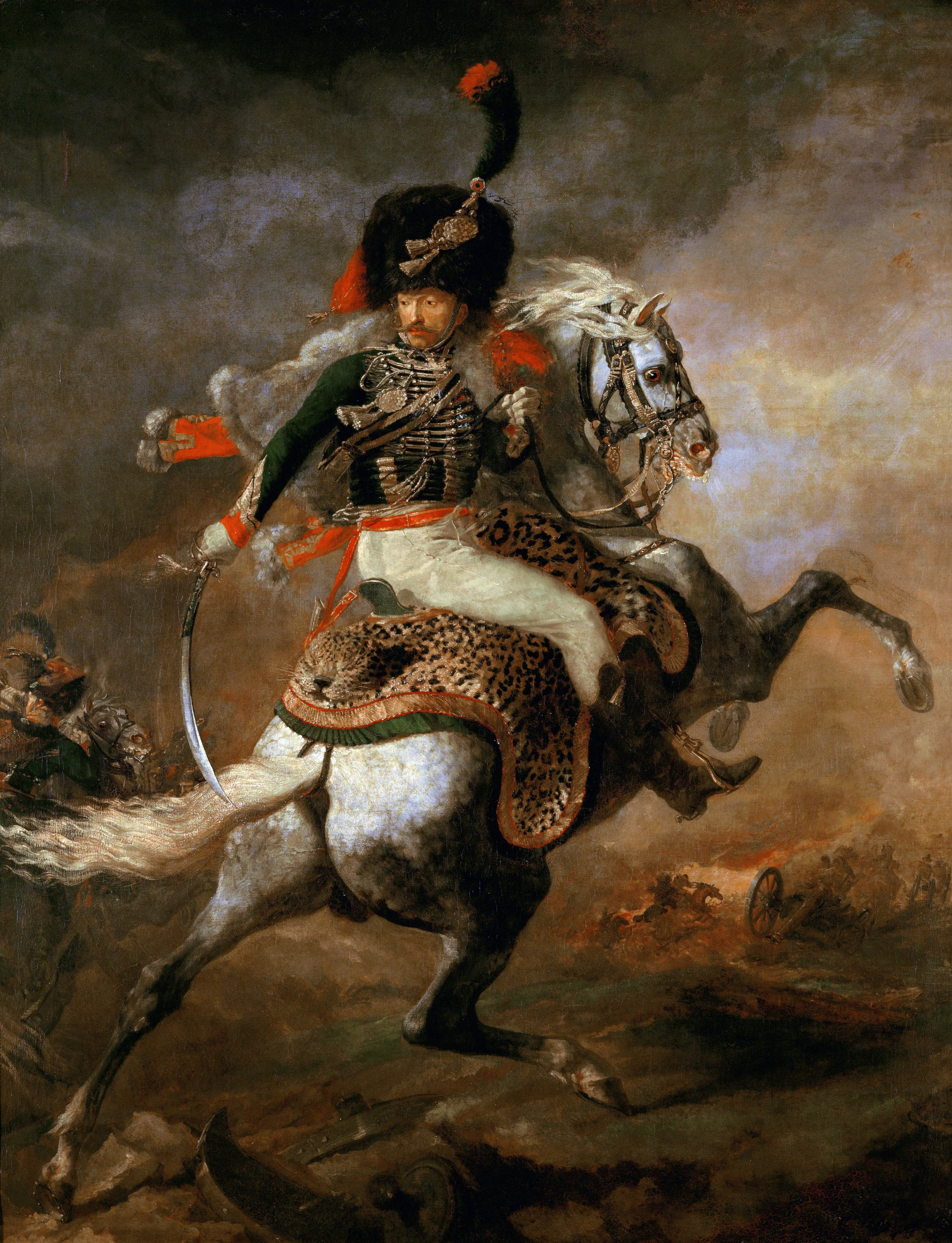
An officer of the Chasseurs à cheval of the Guard by Théodore Géricault, c.1812

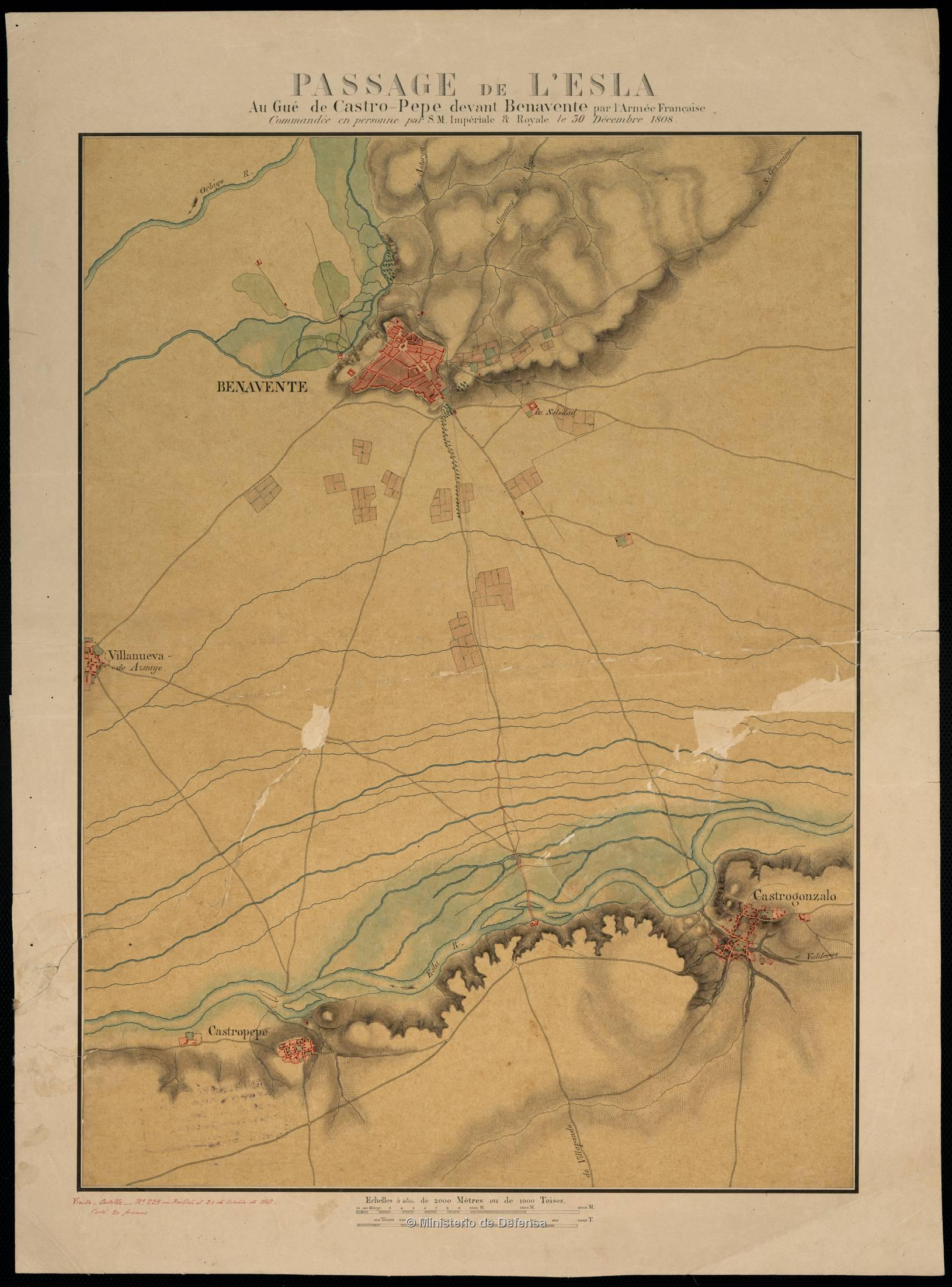
Copy of an 1808 French map which shows the relative position of river Esla, Benavente and Castrogonzalo

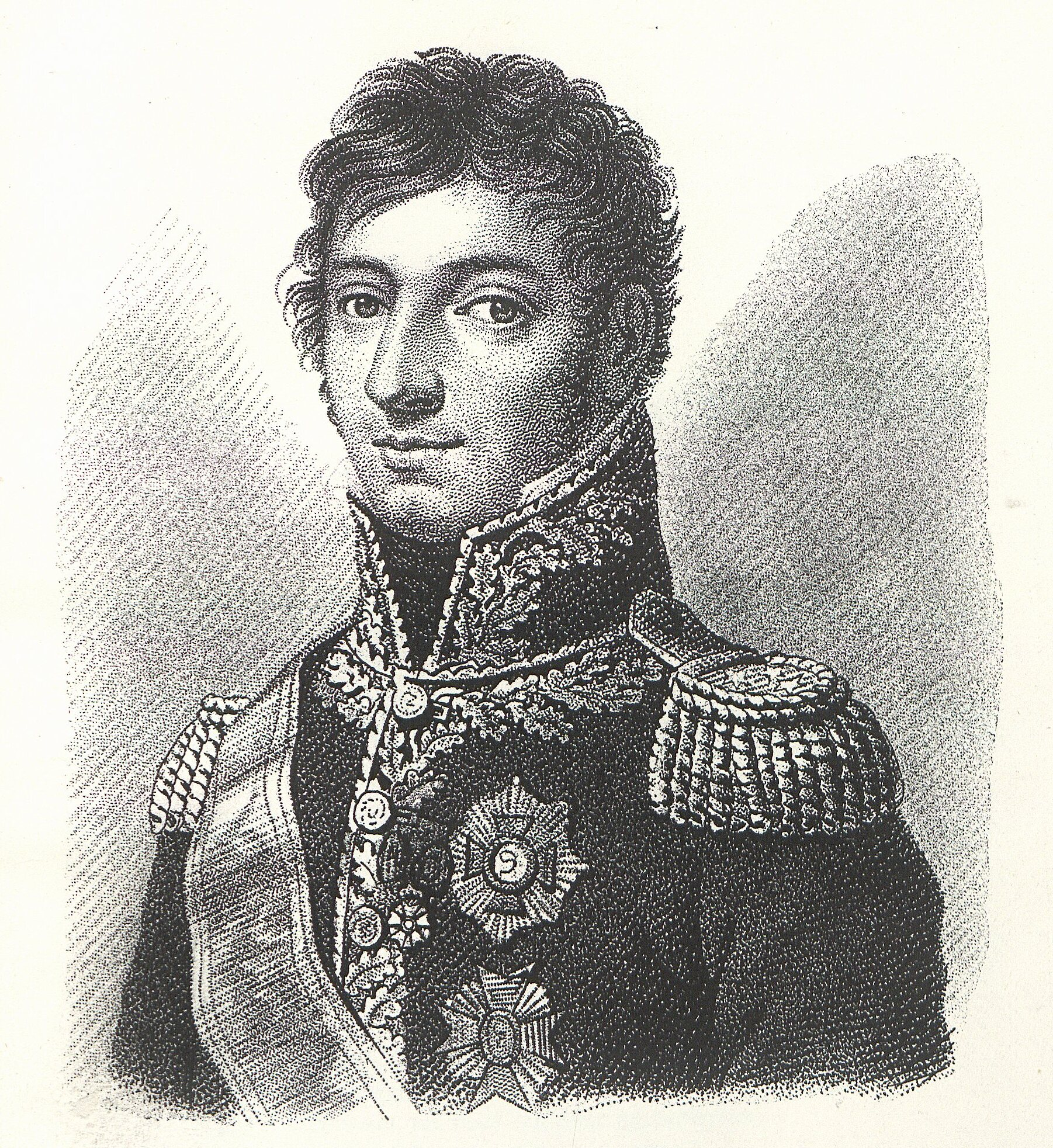
General Lefebvre-Desnouettes

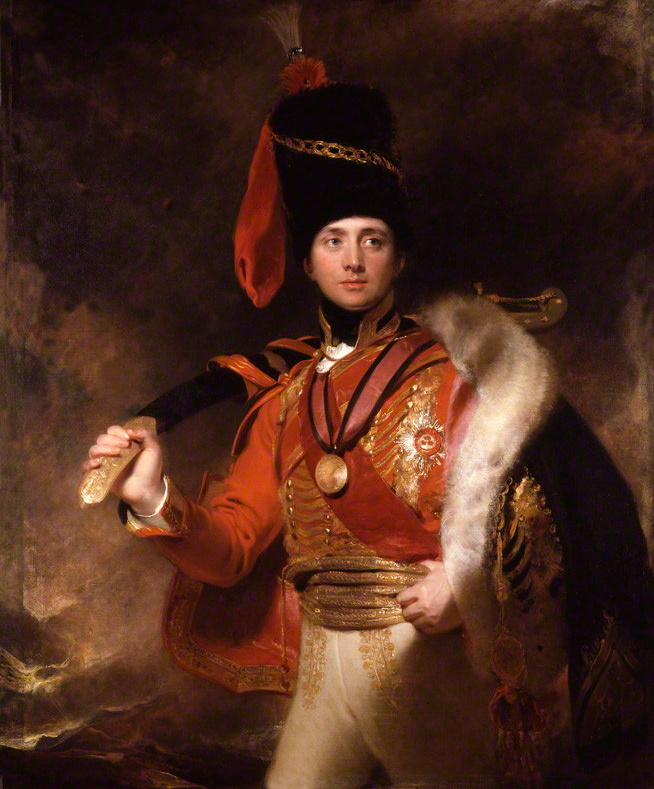
Brigadier General Charles Stewart

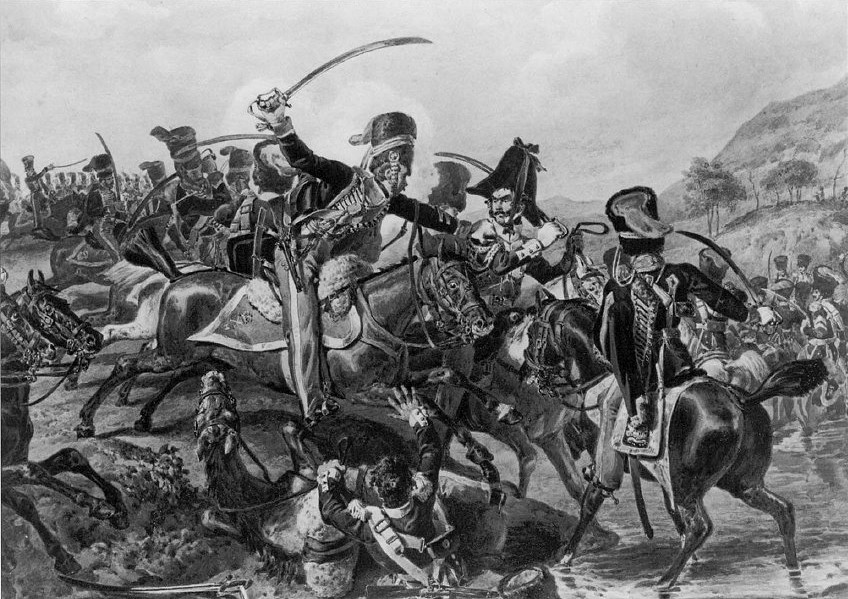
The capture of General Lefebvre-Desnouettes at the battle

== See also ==
- Timeline of the Peninsular War

== Bibliography ==
- Esdaile, Charles J. (2003). The Peninsular War. Palgrave MacMillan. ISBN 9781403962317.
- Anglesey, Marquess of, F.S.A. (1962). One-Leg; The Life and Letters of Henry William Paget, First Marquess of Anglesey, KG, 1768–1854. London: J. Cape.
- Fletcher, I. (1999). Galloping at Everything: The British Cavalry in the Peninsula and at Waterloo 1808-15. Spellmount Staplehurst. ISBN 1-86227-016-3.
- Haythornthwaite, P. J. (2001). Corunna 1809: Sir John Moore's Fighting Retreat. Oxford: Osprey Publishing. ISBN 1-85532-968-9.
- Hibbert, C. (1961). Corunna. London: Batsford.
- Smith, D. (1998). The Napoleonic Wars Data Book. London: Greenhill. ISBN 1-85367-276-9.
- Summerville, C. J. (2007). Who was who at Waterloo: A Biography of the Battle. London: Pearson Education. ISBN 978-0582784055.
- Vane, Charles William (1828). Narrative of the Peninsular War from 1808 to 1813. London: Henry Colburn.

Preceded by Battle of Sahagún	Napoleonic Wars; Battle of Benavente	Succeeded by Battle of Castellón
