= Battle of Sahagún =

1808 battle of the Peninsular War

- Part of the Peninsular War
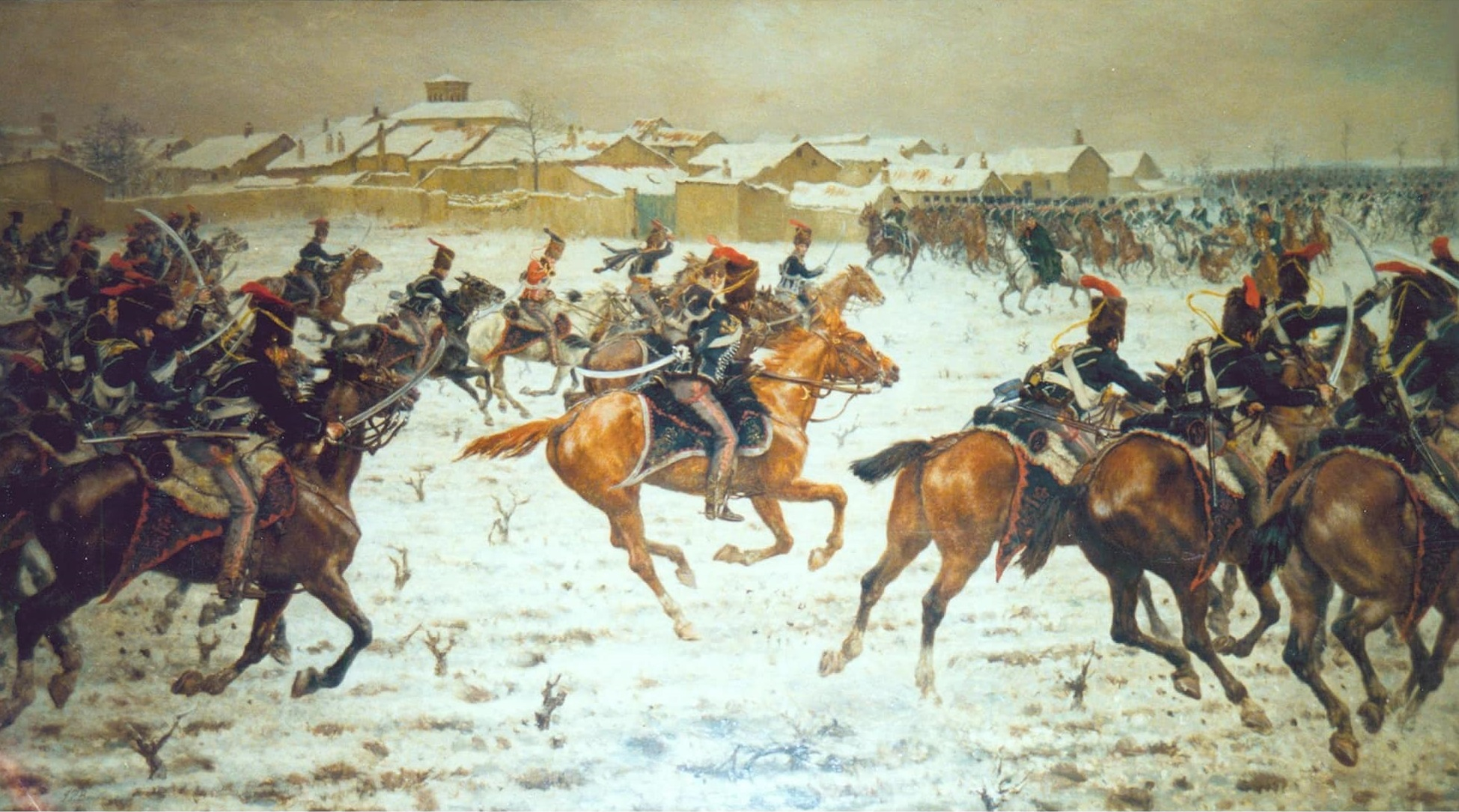
- Painting of the battle
Date	21 December 1808
Location	Sahagún, Spain 42.3708°N 5.0292°W
Result	British victory

Belligerents
United Kingdom	France

Commanders and leaders
Lord Paget	César Alexandre Debelle

Strength
400	800

Casualties and losses
4 killed 21 wounded	20 killed or wounded 313+ captured

Peninsular War: Napoleon's invasion
current battle

The Battle of Sahagún was fought on 21 December 1808 during the Peninsular War. 400 hussars of the British Army under Lieutenant-general Lord Paget defeated 800 French Imperial Army cavalrymen led by Brigade-general César Alexandre Debelle at the town of Sahagún, Spain. The battle was fought as part of the entry into Spain of a British army under Lieutenant-general Sir John Moore. Paget's force suffered four killed and 21 wounded while Debelle's suffered 20 killed or wounded and more than 313 captured.

Of the two French cavalry regiments at the battle, one suffered such heavy casualties that it was subsequently disbanded. The battle was the first engagement fought between British and French forces in Spain during the war, and marked the final extent of the advance of Moore's army into the country. Following the battle, Moore ordered a retreat in the face of overwhelming French forces under Napoleon. Despite British cavalry winning another battle on 29 December, Moore's army continued to retreat to the coast and evacuated Spain in January 1809.

== Background ==
Lieutenant-general Sir John Moore led a British army into the heart of northwestern Spain with the aim of aiding the Spanish in their struggle against French occupation. However, Napoleon had entered Spain at the head of a large army intending to re-establish French interests. This, together with the fall of the Spanish capital Madrid to the French, made the position of the British army untenable. Moore, whose headquarters was at Mayorga, was aware that he must retreat towards the coast in the face of the overwhelming odds ranged against him. However, he was also aware that Marshal Soult's apparently unsupported corps was nearby, on the Carrión River, and before beginning his retreat he wished to make a strike against Soult. As part of this design the cavalry under Henry, Lord Paget were sent towards Soult, as a reconnaissance in force, ahead of the infantry.

Forces

The French fielded a brigade under Brigade-general César Alexandre Debelle composed of the 1st Provisional Chasseurs à Cheval and the 8th Dragoons.

The British force was composed of the 15th Hussars (Note: The official designation of the regiments of British light cavalry converted to hussars (in 1806-07) was in the form "15th Light Dragoons (Hussars)," but they were usually termed "15th Hussars" etc.) from the brigade of Charles Stewart and the 10th Hussars of John Slade's brigade, however, the latter regiment did not come into direct combat.

== Battle ==
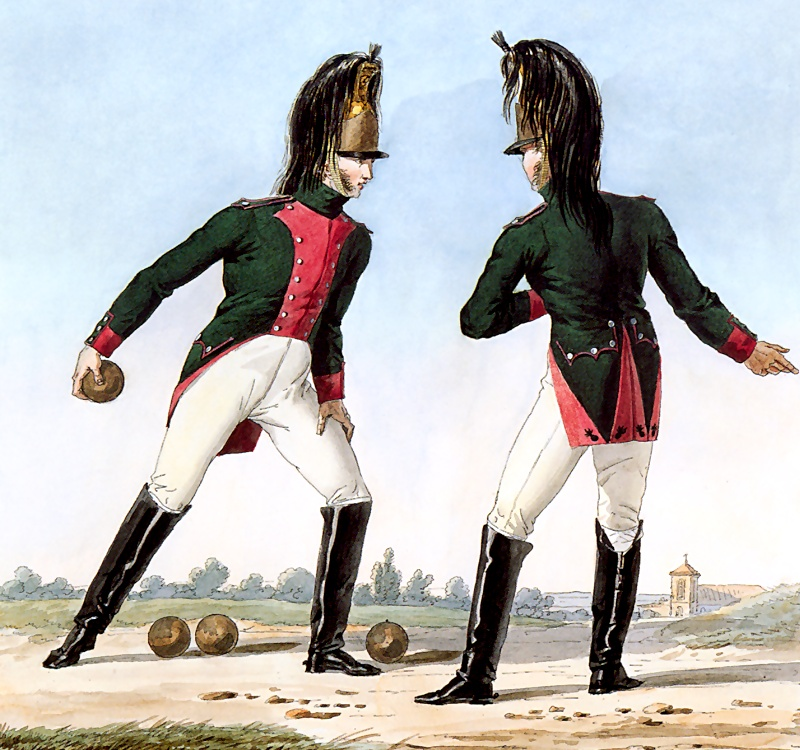
Two privates of the 8th Dragoon Regiment

On a bitterly cold night Lieutenant-general Lord Paget ordered the 10th Hussars to move through the town of Sahagún, then occupied by a French cavalry force, whilst he made a sweep around Sahagún with the 15th Hussars in order that the French might be trapped. Unfortunately General John Slade was tardy in moving off with the 10th Hussars; the French cavalry became aware of the proximity of the British cavalry and exited from the town to the east unmolested. Slade apparently harangued his hussars with a lengthy and quite ludicrous speech, ending with the words: "blood and slaughter. March!" In the dawn light the French regiments, catching sight of the 15th Hussars to the south, formed up in two lines with the 1st Provisional Chasseurs (commanded by Colonel Tascher, a relative of the Empress Josephine - though he may not have been present) in front and the 8th Dragoons behind them. Unusually, the French cavalry received the charge of the British hussars whilst stationary and tried to halt it with carbine fire.

The 15th Hussars charged, over about 400 yards (370 m) of snowy, frozen ground, shouting "Emsdorf and Victory!", the Battle of Emsdorf being an earlier action, 16 July 1760, in which the 15th had played a notable part. Not all of the 15th proved to be equally adept, it is reported that one clumsy hussar managed to shoot his own horse during the pursuit. It was so cold the hussars wore their pelisses, rather than having them slung over their shoulders, and many had cloaks over all. Eyewitnesses also spoke of numbed hands hardly able to grasp reins and sabres. The impact when the hussars met the chasseurs was terrible, as one British officer recorded: "horses and men were overthrown and a shriek of terror, intermixed with oaths, groans and prayers for mercy issued from the whole extent of their front." The impetus of the British hussars carried them through the ranks of the chasseurs and into those of the dragoons behind. The French force was broken, and it routed eastwards with the British in pursuit. Many French cavalrymen (though the chasseurs were largely of German origin) were taken prisoner at very little cost to the 15th Hussars. Two French lieutenant colonels were captured and the chasseurs, who lost many men captured, ceased to exist as a viable regiment. The 10th Hussars came up during the pursuit, however, they were initially mistaken for French cavalry. This caused the 15th Hussars to break off their pursuit to re-form, ending the action.

== Aftermath ==
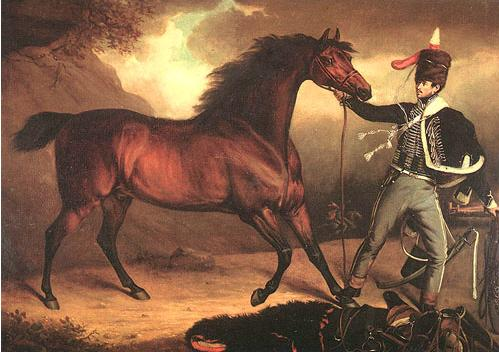
1812 painting of a 7th Hussars private. 12 men of the 7th Hussars fought at Sahagún, serving as Lord Paget's escort.

Moore's attack against Soult ended with the Battle of Sahagún because the main French forces were approaching. He started instead the long, painful and almost disastrous British retreat ending with the Battle of Corunna, at the port on the Galician coast. The presence of Moore's army had as he intended focused Napoleon's attention upon it, allowing the Spanish some time to reorganise and regroup after the defeats they had suffered. The 15th Hussars' charge and subsequent victory meant that the French cavalry were reluctant to fight the British cavalry for the remainder of the campaign. The 1st Provisional Chasseurs à Cheval were so depleted by their losses at Sahagún that they were disbanded.

British hussars won one more victory over their French counterparts during the Corunna campaign when, on 29 December 1808, at the Battle of Benavente they drove Napoleon's elite Mounted Chasseurs of the Imperial Guard into the River Esla, capturing their commanding officer, Charles Lefebvre-Desnouettes. The 15th Hussars were awarded "Sahagun" as a Battle Honour, which is still celebrated today by The Light Dragoons and B Battery Royal Horse Artillery which is now part of 1st Regiment Royal Horse Artillery.

== See also ==
- Timeline of the Peninsular War

== Bibliography ==
- Esdaile, Charles J. (2003). The Peninsular War. Palgrave MacMillan. ISBN 9781403962317.
- Fletcher, Ian (1999). Galloping at Everything. Spellmount Staplehurst. ISBN 1-86227-016-3.
- Glover, Gareth (2007). From Corunna to Waterloo: The Letters and Journals of Two Napoleonic Hussars, 1801–1816. London. ISBN 978-1-86227-016-9.
- Hibbert, Christopher (1961). Corunna. Batsford.
- Smith, Digby (1961). The Napoleonic Wars Data Book. London: Greenhill. ISBN 1-85367-276-9.

Preceded by Second siege of Zaragoza	Napoleonic Wars; Battle of Sahagún	Succeeded by Battle of Benavente
