= John Moore (British Army officer) =

British Army officer and politician (1761–1809)

Lieutenant-General Sir John Moore KB
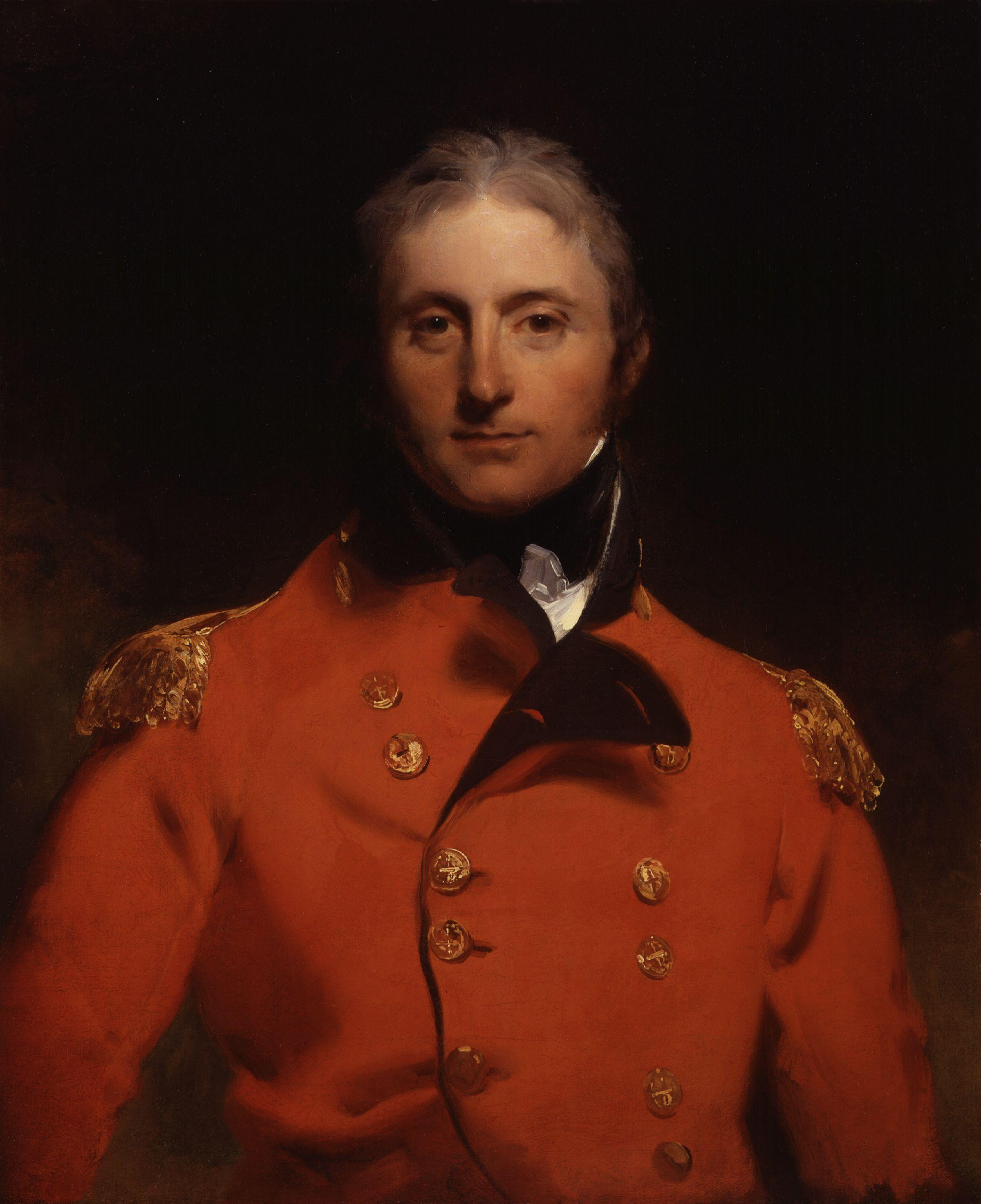
- Portrait of Sir John Moore by Sir Thomas Lawrence, c. 1800–1804
- Born: 13 November 1761; Glasgow, Scotland
- Died: 16 January 1809 (aged 47); A Coruña, Province of A Coruña, Spain
- Military career
- Allegiance: Great Britain; United Kingdom
- Branch: British Army
- Service years: 1776–1809
- Rank: Lieutenant-general
- Conflicts: American War of Independence; Penobscot Expedition; French Revolutionary Wars; Siege of Calvi (WIA); Irish Rebellion of 1798; Battle of Foulksmills; Anglo-Russian invasion of Holland; Battle of Callantsoog; Battle of Krabbendam (WIA); Battle of Alkmaar (1799) (WIA); French invasion of Egypt and Syria; Battle of Abukir (1801); Battle of Alexandria (1801); Peninsular War; Battle of Palavea; Battle of Corunna †
- Awards: Order of the Bath
- Other work: MP for Lanark Burghs

Lieutenant-General Sir John Moore (13 November 1761 – 16 January 1809) was a British Army officer and Whig politician who represented Lanark Burghs in the House of Commons of Great Britain from 1784 to 1790. He is known for his military training reforms and for his death at the Battle of Corunna, in which he fought a French army under Marshal Jean-de-Dieu Soult during the Peninsular War.

== Early years ==
John Moore was born in Glasgow, the son of John Moore, a physician and writer, and the older brother of Admiral Sir Graham Moore. He attended Glasgow High School, but at the age of 11 joined his father and Douglas, the young 16-year-old 8th Duke of Hamilton (1756–1799), his father's pupil, on a Grand Tour of France, Italy and Germany. This included a two-year stay in Geneva, where Moore's education continued.

== Military and political career, 1776–1798 ==
He joined the British Army in 1776 as an ensign in the 51st Regiment of Foot then based in Menorca. He first saw action in 1778 during the American War of Independence as a lieutenant in the 82nd Regiment of Foot, which was raised in Lanarkshire for service in North America by the 8th Duke of Hamilton. From 1779 to 1781 he was garrisoned at Halifax, Nova Scotia. In 1779, he distinguished himself in action during the Penobscot Expedition in present-day Maine, when a small British detachment held off a much larger American force until reinforcements arrived. After the war, in 1783, he returned to Britain and in 1784 was elected to the Parliament of Great Britain as the Whig member for Lanark Burghs, a seat he held until 1790.

In 1787 he was made Major and joined the 60th briefly before returning to the 51st. In 1791 his unit was assigned to the Mediterranean and he was involved in campaigning in the invasion of Corsica in 1794 during the War of the First Coalition and was wounded at Calvi. He was given a Colonelcy and became Adjutant-General to Sir Charles Stuart.

Friction between Moore and the new British viceroy of Corsica led to his recall and posting to the West Indies under Sir Ralph Abercromby in 1796. Moore played a leading role in the British recapture of Saint Lucia, which at the time was under the nominal control of the French as a result of a successful invasion by the French Republican administrator Victor Hugues. During the campaign, Moore retook Fort Charlotte with the 27th Inniskilling Fusiliers after two days of bitter fighting. The regiment were honoured for their actions in capturing the fort by having their regimental colour displayed on the flagstaff of the captured fortress at Morne Fortune for an hour, before being replaced by the British flag. Upon the capture of the fort, Abercromby departed the island, placing Moore in charge of the garrison. Moore remained at this post until falling ill with yellow fever, upon which he was repatriated to Britain.

== Moore in Ireland, 1798 ==
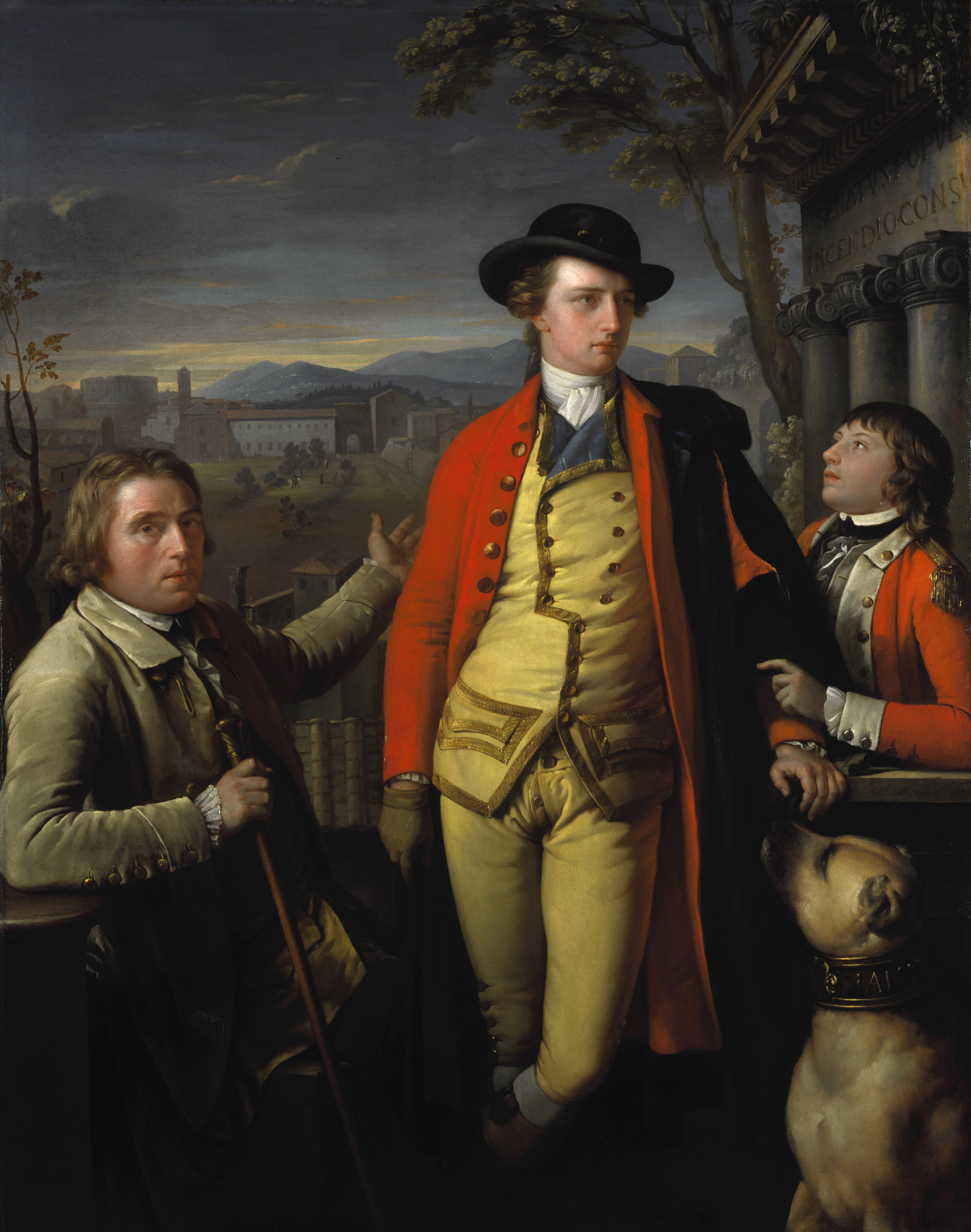
Moore's father, the 8th Duke of Hamilton, and a young John Moore, painted in Rome by Gavin Hamilton, 1775–76

In 1798 he was made Major-General and served in the suppression of the Irish Rebellion of 1798. His personal intervention was credited with turning the tide at the Battle of Foulksmills on 20 June and he regained control of Wexford town before General Gerard Lake could, thereby possibly preventing its sacking.

== Moore and military training ==
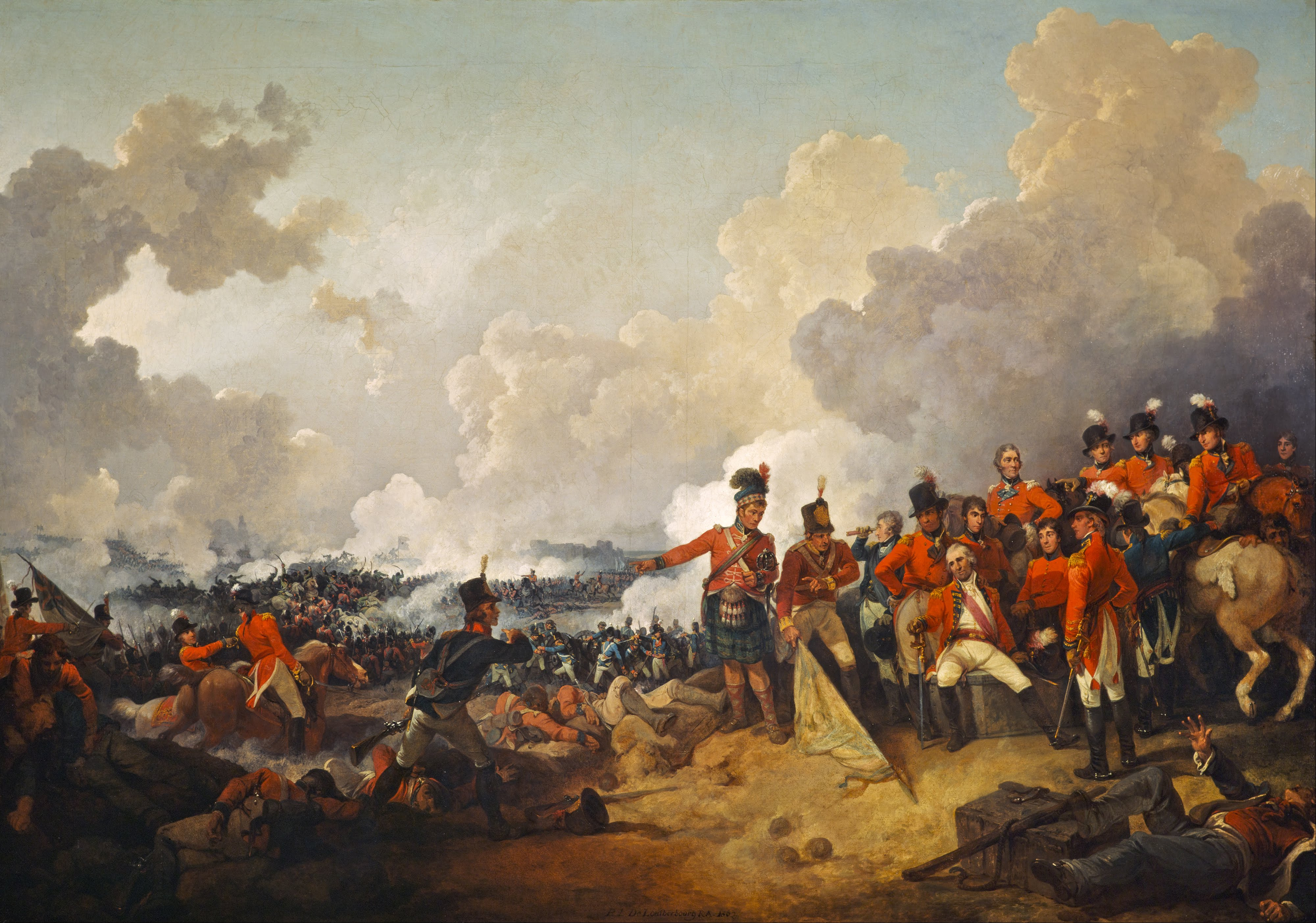
The Battle of Alexandria by Philip James de Loutherbourg. Moore is amongst the officers gathered around the fatally wounded Ralph Abercromby.

In 1799 he commanded a brigade in the Helder Expedition, with the campaign failing after the British and Russian forces failed to overcome entrenched Dutch defenders. Moore himself was seriously injured in the action. He recovered to lead the 52nd regiment during the British campaign in Egypt against the French, having become colonel of that regiment in 1801 on the death of General Cyrus Trapaud.

He returned to Britain in 1803 to command a brigade at Shorncliffe Army Camp near Folkestone, where he established the innovative system of drill and manoeuvre. The historian Sir Arthur Bryant wrote: "Moore's contribution to the British Army was not only that matchless Light Infantry who have ever since enshrined his training, but also the belief that the perfect soldier can only be made by evoking all that is finest in man – physical, mental and spiritual."

== War with France, 1803–1808 ==
When it became clear that Napoleon was planning an invasion of Britain, Moore was put in charge of the defence of the coast from Dover to Dungeness. It was on his initiative that the Martello Towers were constructed (complementing the already constructed Shorncliffe Redoubt), following a pattern he had been impressed with in Corsica, where the Torra di Mortella, at Mortella Point, had offered a stout resistance to British land and sea forces. He also initiated the cutting of the Royal Military Canal in Kent and Sussex, and recruited about 340,000 volunteers to a militia that would have defended the lines of the South Downs if an invading force had broken through the regular army defences. In 1804 Moore was made a Knight Companion of the Bath and, in 1805, he was promoted to Lieutenant-General.

In 1806 he returned to active duty in the Mediterranean and then in 1808 in the Baltic with Edward Paget to assist the Swedes. Disagreements with Gustav IV Adolf soon led to his being sent home where he was ordered to Portugal in July 1808.

== Spanish War, 1808–1809 ==
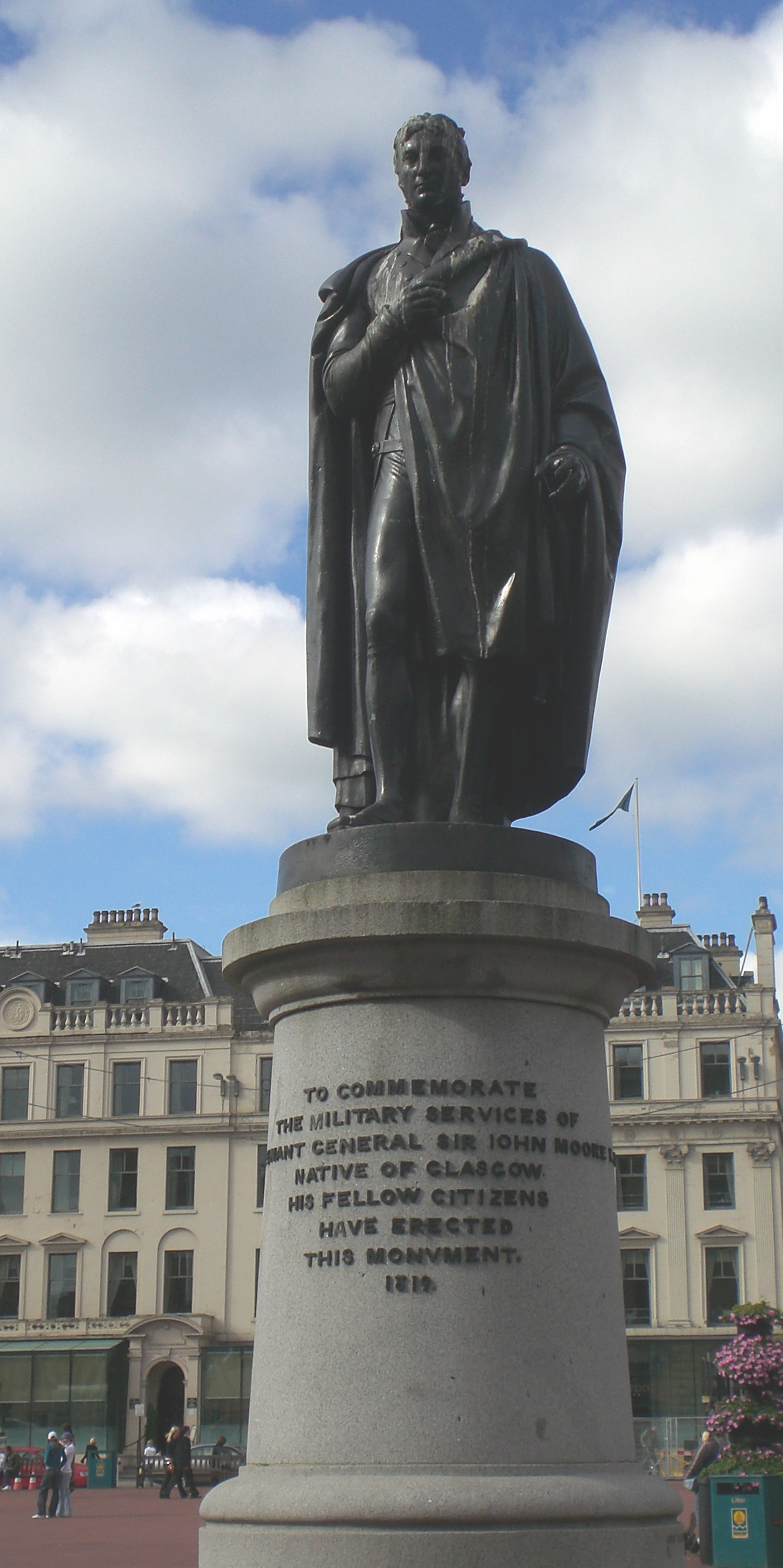
Statue of Sir John Moore in Glasgow, 1819, designed by John Flaxman

Moore took command of the British forces in the Iberian Peninsula following the recall of Sir Harry Burrard, Sir Hew Dalrymple and Sir Arthur Wellesley (the future Duke of Wellington) to face the inquiry over the Convention of Cintra on the French troops' evacuation from Portugal. When Napoleon arrived in Spain with 200,000 men, Moore drew the French northwards while retreating to his embarkation ports of A Coruña and Vigo. Moore established a defensive position on hills outside the town while being guarded by the 15th Hussars.

Moore was fatally wounded at the Battle of Corunna, being "struck in his left breast and shoulder by a cannon shot, which broke his ribs, his arm, lacerated his shoulder and the whole of his left side and lungs". Like Admiral Lord Nelson, he was mortally wounded in battle, surviving long enough to be assured that he had gained a victory. He remained conscious and composed throughout his final hours. Before succumbing to his wounds, Moore confided to his old friend and aide-de-camp, Colonel Paul Anderson: (Note: Anderson served as Acting Adjutant-General in Moore's division (Kieran, p. 51)) "You know, I always wished to die this way, I hope the people of England will be satisfied! I hope my country will do me justice!" He asked Colonel Anderson to speak to his friends and mother, but became too emotional to continue, and changed the subject. He asked if his staff were safe and was assured that they were, (Note: In fact Captain Burrard, the son of Sir Harry Burrard, was also mortally wounded, but Anderson decided to keep this from Moore (Moore 1834, p. 228).) and where his will could be found. Casting his eyes around the room, he spied Charles Banks Stanhope and said to him: "Remember me to your sister, Stanhope." (Note: Lady Hester Stanhope was the niece of the William Pitt the Younger, and became an intrepid Near East Asia traveller. (Her niece suspected they might have considered marrying.).) He was then silent and died shortly afterwards.

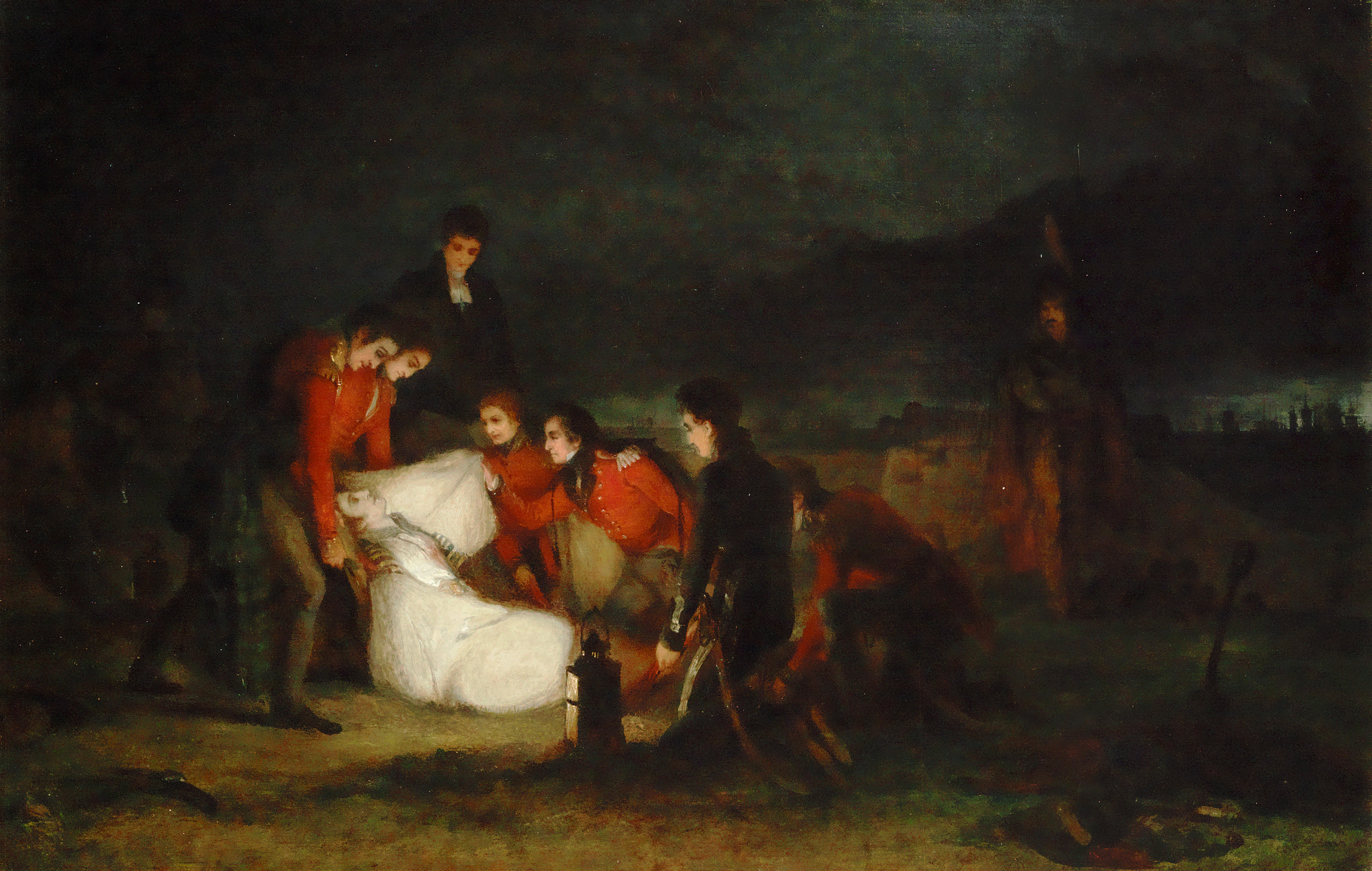
The Burial of Sir John Moore after Corunna by George Jones, 1834.

In 1815, French General Jean Sarrazin published a history of the Peninsular War, in which he argued: "Whatever Bonaparte may assert, Soult was most certainly repulsed at Corunna; and the English gained a defensive victory, though dearly purchased with the loss of their brave general Moore, who was alike distinguished for his private virtues, and his military talents." (Note: 'France militaire': "Ayant neanmoins reunit les troupes a la Corogne, il repousse glorieusement les Francais, et meurt sur le champ de bataille." which translates as "Having nevertheless reunited the troops at Corunna, he [Moore] gloriously repulsed the French and died on the field of battle.") Though Moore's army had been "compelled to conduct a precipitate retreat and evacuate by sea", leaving Madrid and Northern Spain under French military occupation, the Peninsular War continued on.

== Legacy ==
Moore was buried wrapped in a military cloak in the ramparts of the town. Moore's funeral was commemorated in "The Burial of Sir John Moore after Corunna" by the Irish poet Charles Wolfe (1791–1823), which became popular in 19th-century poetry anthologies. The first verse runs:

Not a drum was heard, not a funeral note,
As his corse to the rampart we hurried;
Not a soldier discharged his farewell shot
O'er the grave where our hero we buried.

ending six verses later with:

Slowly and sadly we laid him down,
From the field of his fame fresh and gory;
We carved not a line, and we raised not a stone,
But we left him alone with his glory.

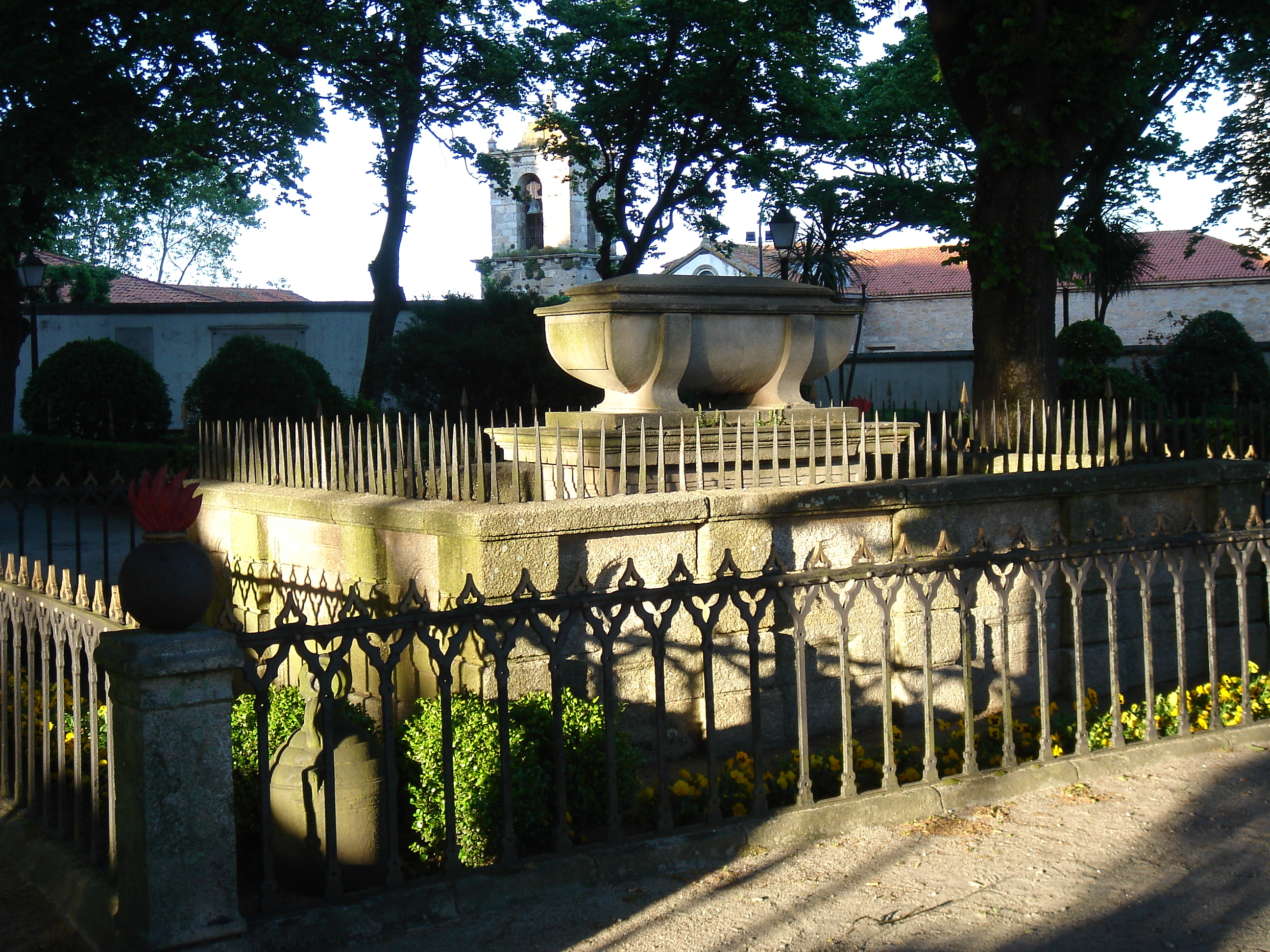
Moore's tomb in San Carlos Garden at A Coruña

Although the soldier and historian Sir William Francis Patrick Napier, a contemporary of Moore, attributes the funeral monument to Marshal Jean-de-Dieu Soult, it was erected by orders of the Spanish commander, the Marquis de la Romana, when he returned to Corunna after the French abandoned Galicia.

In his native Glasgow he is commemorated by the 1819 Statue of Sir John Moore in George Square, and in England by a monument in St Paul's Cathedral by the sculptor John Bacon. Houses are named for him at the High School of Glasgow. Sir John Moore Avenue is in Hythe, Kent, near the Royal Military Canal.

Parliament of Great Britain
Preceded by Sir James Cockburn, Bt	Member of Parliament for Lanark Burghs; 1784 – 1790	Succeeded by William Grieve
Military offices
Preceded by Cyrus Trapaud	Colonel of the 52nd (Oxfordshire) Regiment of Foot; 1801–1809	Succeeded by Sir Hildebrand Oakes
