= Battle of Corunna =

1809 battle of the Peninsular War

- Part of the Peninsular War
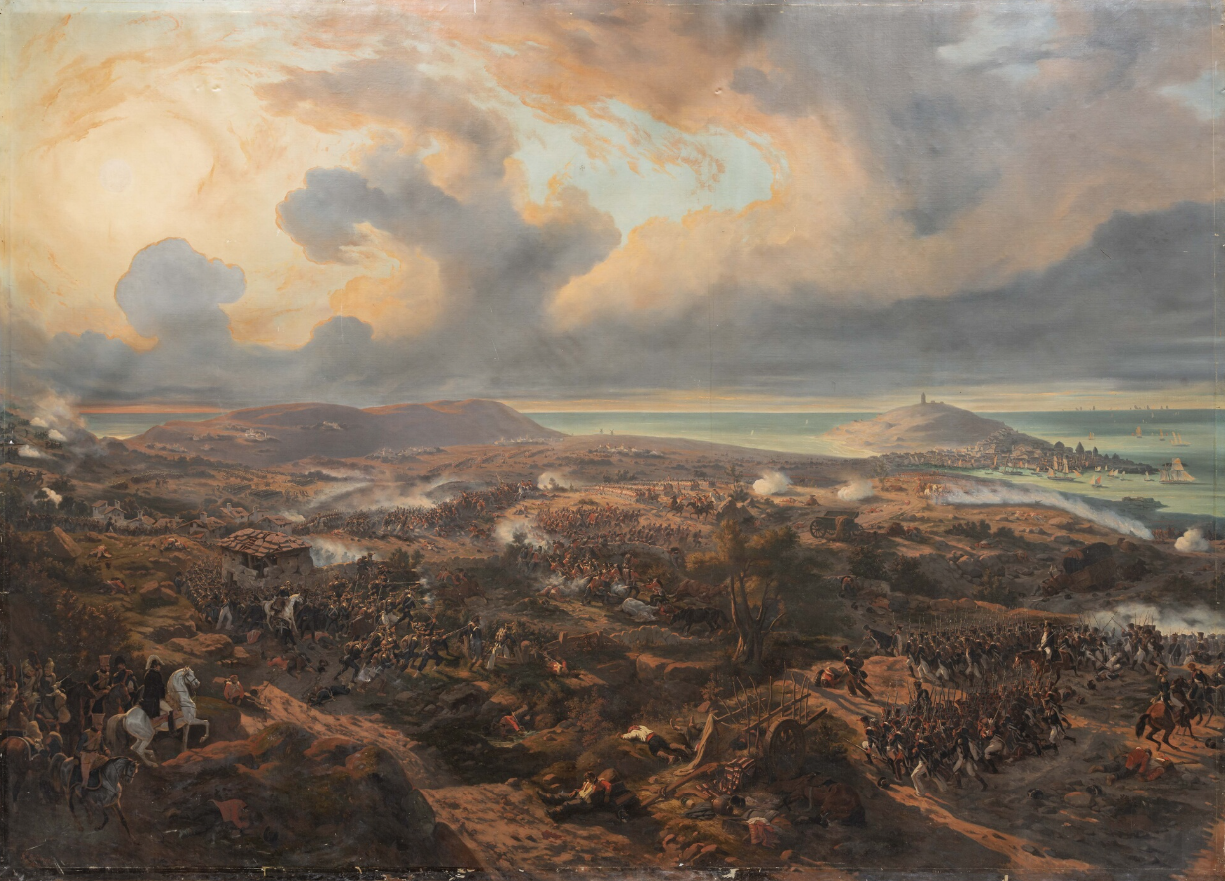
- 1843 painting of the battle
Date	16 January 1809 (Note: Already on the 15th, a skirmish between the advance units took place.)
Location	A Coruña, Galicia 43°19′57″N 08°24′45″W
Result	See Analysis
Territorial changes	French occupation of Northern Spain

Belligerents
France	United Kingdom

Commanders and leaders
Jean-de-Dieu Soult; Armand de La Houssaye; Julien Mermet; Pierre Merle; Henri Delaborde; Jean Lorge	John Moore †; David Baird (WIA); John Hope; Edward Paget; Alexander Fraser

Strength
12,000 infantry 3,200 cavalry 20 guns	15,000 infantry 1,000 cavalry 9–12 guns

Casualties and losses
600–700 killed or wounded 200–300 captured	800–900 dead or wounded 300 missing 300 sick abandoned 6 transports lost

Peninsular War: Spain
current battle
Wellington in command
Wellington not in command

The Battle of Corunna (or A Coruña, La Corunna, La Coruña or La Corogne), in Spain known as Battle of Elviña, took place on 16 January 1809, when a French corps under Marshal of the Empire Jean de Dieu Soult attacked a British army under Lieutenant-General Sir John Moore. The battle took place during the Peninsular War, which was part of the wider Napoleonic Wars.

Doggedly pursued by the French under Soult, the British retreated across northern Spain while their rearguard fought off repeated French attacks. Both armies suffered from the harsh winter conditions. Much of the British army, excluding the elite Light Brigade under Robert Craufurd, suffered from a loss of order and discipline during the retreat. When the British eventually reached the port of Corunna on the northern coast of Galicia, a few days ahead of the French, they found their transport ships had not arrived. The fleet arrived after a couple of days and the British were embarking when the French forces attacked.

Soult had fewer infantry, but superior cavalry and artillery; however, the local rough terrain was unfavorable for cavalry. The British had larger quantities of ammunition for muskets, as a result of which their fire would be much better sustained than that of the enemy. They also held an imposing defensive position based on the mountainous terrain that Iberia is rich in; this position was mostly hidden from Soult's view, thence he could only guess at the enemy's numbers. In the resulting back-and-forth action, the British held off the French until nightfall, when both armies disengaged. British forces resumed their embarkation overnight; the last transports left in the morning under French cannon fire. The port cities of Corunna and Ferrol, as well as northern Spain, were captured by the French. During the battle, Sir John Moore, the British commander, was mortally wounded, dying after learning that his men had successfully withstood the French attacks. Before being wounded, he managed to give important orders in time for strengthening the defensive line around the village of Elviña^{[es]}. General Sir John Hope soon took over command from the wounded Moore and brought the battle to an end.

== Background ==
The Corunna campaign started with the Battle of Cardedeu.

=== Prelude ===
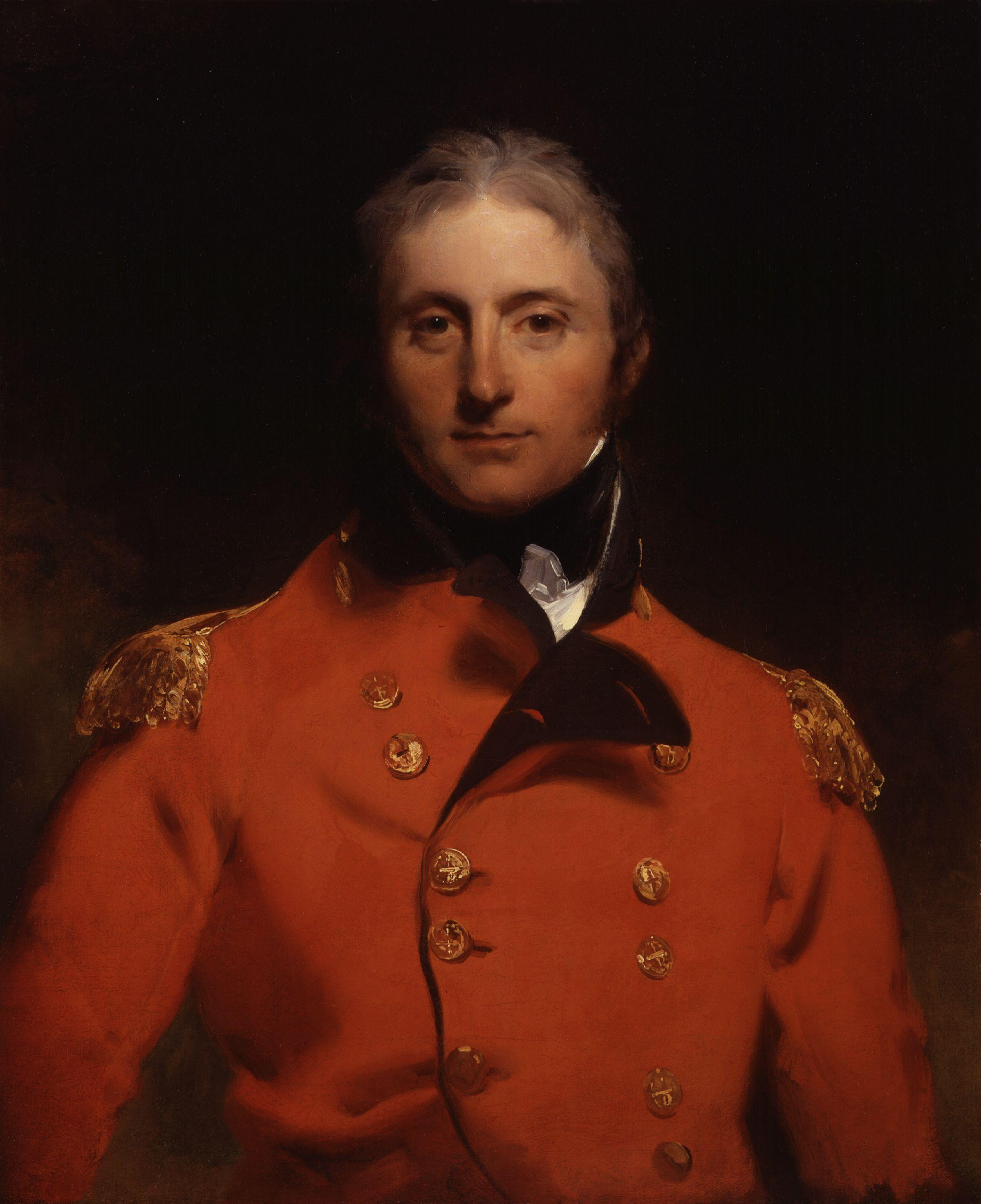
Portrait of Sir John Moore by Thomas Lawrence. Moore commanded the British forces at Corunna

In early October 1808, following the scandal in Britain over the Convention of Sintra and the recall of the generals Dalrymple, Burrard and Wellesley, Sir John Moore took command of the 30,000-man British force in Portugal. In addition, Sir David Baird in command of an expedition of reinforcements out of Falmouth consisting of 150 transports carrying between 12,000 and 13,000 men, convoyed by HMS Louie, HMS Amelia and HMS Champion, entered Corunna Harbour on 13 October. By November 1808 the British army, led by Moore, advanced into Spain with orders to assist the Spanish armies in their struggle against the invading forces of Napoleon.

After the surrender of a French army corps at Bailén and the loss of Portugal, Napoleon was convinced of the peril he faced in Spain. Deeply disturbed by news of Sintra, the Emperor remarked,

I see that everybody has lost their head since the infamous capitulation of Bailén. I realise that I must go there myself to get the machine working again.

The French, all but masters of Spain in June, stood with their backs to the Pyrenees, clutching at Navarre and Catalonia. They did not know if even these two footholds could be maintained in the face of a Spanish attack. By October French strength in Spain, including garrisons, was about 75,000 soldiers. They were facing 86,000 Spanish troops with Spain's 35,000 British allies en route.

However, no attack came. The Spanish social fabric, shaken by the shock of rebellion, gave way to crippling social and political tensions; the patriots stood divided on every question and their nascent war effort suffered accordingly. With the fall of the monarchy, constitutional power devolved to local juntas. These institutions interfered with the army and the business of war, undermined the tentative central government taking shape in Madrid, and in some cases proved almost as dangerous to each other as to the French. (Note: John Lawrence Tone has questioned this assessment of the Spanish juntas on the grounds that it relies too much on the accounts of British officers and elites; these sources being patently unfair to the revolutionaries, "whom they despised for being Jacobins, Catholics, and Spaniards, not necessarily in that order." (Tone 2004, p. 110).) The British Army in Portugal, meanwhile, was itself immobilized by logistical problems and bogged down in administrative disputes, and did not budge.

Months of inaction had passed at the front, the revolution having "temporarily crippled Patriot Spain at the very moment when decisive action could have changed the whole course of the war". While the allies inched forward, a vast consolidation of bodies and bayonets from the far reaches of the French Empire brought 100,000 veterans of the Grande Armée into Spain, led in person by Napoleon and his Marshals. With his Armée d'Espagne of 278,670 men drawn up on the Ebro, facing a scant 80,000 raw, disorganized Spanish troops, the Emperor announced to the Spanish deputies:

I am here with the soldiers who conquered at Austerlitz, at Jena, at Eylau. Who can withstand them? Certainly not your wretched Spanish troops who do not know how to fight. I shall conquer Spain in two months and acquire the rights of a conqueror.

Starting in October 1808 Napoleon led the French on a brilliant offensive involving a massive double envelopment of the Spanish lines. The attack began in November and has been described as "an avalanche of fire and steel".

For a time the British army was dangerously dispersed, with Baird's newly arrived contingent at Astorga to the north, Moore at Salamanca and Hope 70 miles (110 km) to the east near Madrid with all Moore's cavalry and artillery. The main army, under Moore, had advanced to Salamanca and were joined by Hope's detachment on 3 December when Moore received news that the Spanish forces had suffered several defeats. He considered that to avoid disaster he must give up and retreat back to Portugal. (Note: Neale shows that correspondence from both Berthier, in a letter on 10 December 1808, and Moore in a dispatch on 28 December, indicate that both sides were aware that the allies were defeated and that the British were prepared to retreat. Berthier wrote "...everything inclines us to think that they [the British] are in full retreat..." (Neale 1809, Appendix—XXXV p. 100), and Moore that "I had no time to lose to secure my retreat" (Neale 1809, Appendix—XXXVI p. 102).)

Moore, before retreating, received intelligence of Soult's 16,000-man corps' scattered and isolated position at Carrión and that the French were unaware of the British army's position. On 15 December, he seized this opportunity to advance on the French near Madrid, hoping that to defeat Soult and possibly divert Napoleon's forces. A junction with Baird on 20 December, advancing from Corunna, raised Moore's strength to 23,500 infantry, 2,400 cavalry and 60 guns and he opened his attack with a successful raid by Lieutenant-General Paget's cavalry on the French picquets at Sahagún on 21 December. However, Moore failed to follow up against a surprised Soult. Moore halted for two days and allowed Soult to concentrate his corps.

== Prelude ==
=== Retreat to Corunna ===
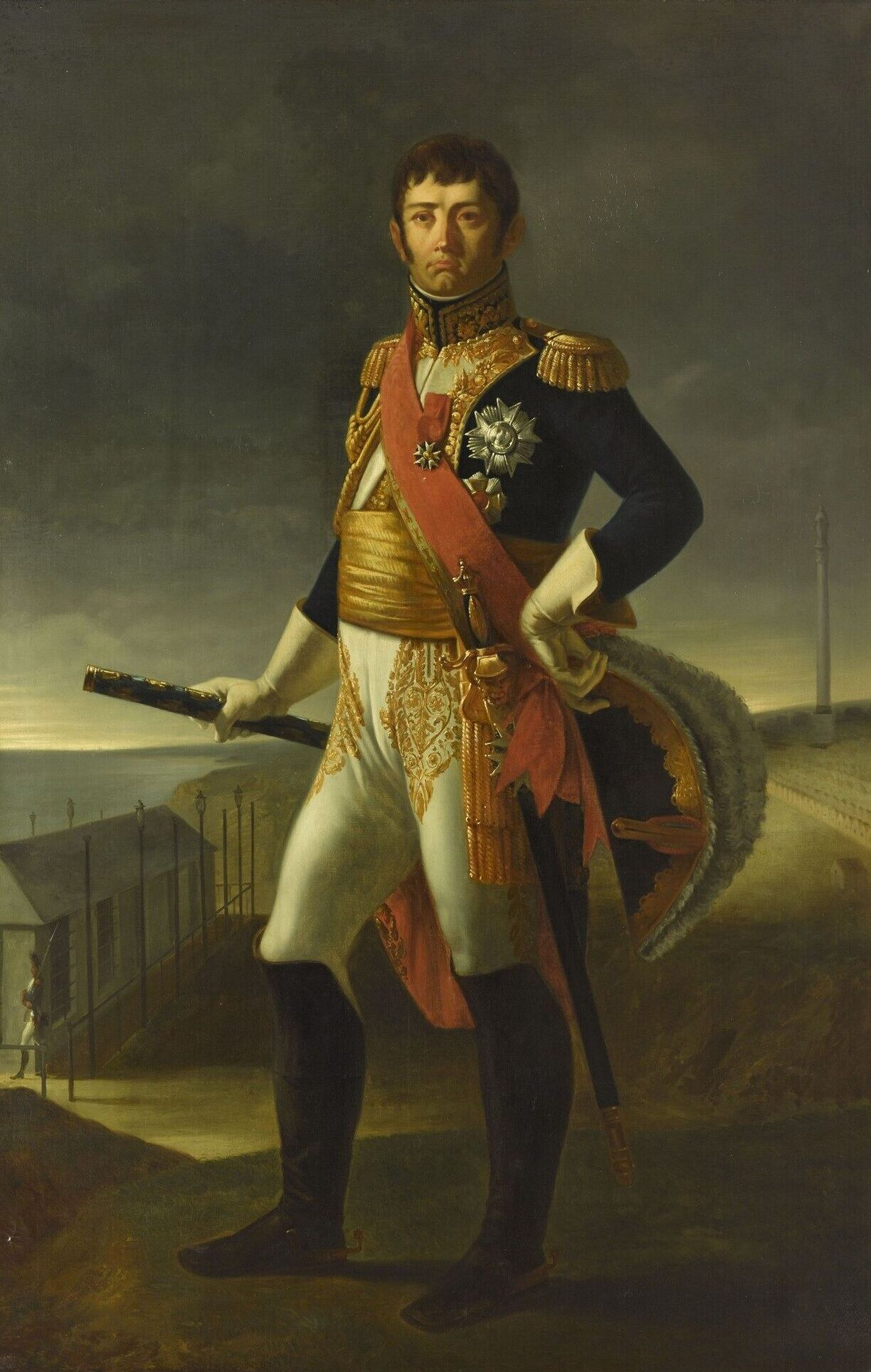
Marshal Jean-de-Dieu Soult, the French commander

Once Moore made his presence known Napoleon responded with customary swiftness and decisiveness. The Spanish were defeated and no longer an organized threat. His army was generally concentrated while the enemy was dispersed. With the initiative firmly in his grasp, Napoleon seized the chance to destroy Britain's only field army. When Moore realized he was in serious danger of being trapped he called off his advance and went into headlong retreat. This epic dash and chase would cover more than 250 miles (400 km), during which the British cavalry and the infantry of the Light Brigade were used to cover the movements of Moore's army after their retreat began on 25 December. This saw them engage the French in small rearguard clashes, including defeating a French cavalry force and capturing General Charles Lefebvre-Desnouettes at Benavente before entering the mountains of Galicia, and another at Cacabelos where General Colbert-Chabanais was killed by a British rifleman.

The retreat of the British, closely followed by their French pursuers, took them through mountainous terrain in dreadful conditions of cold and snow and was marked by exhausting marches, privation, and suffering. Moore was joined at Astorga by General Romana leading the remnants of Blake's Spanish forces and Romana proposed they make a stand. However, with Napoleon closing in, Moore declined and continued his retreat north while Romana went west towards Portugal. On the march between Astorga and Betanzos the British army lost 3,000 men with 500 more left in hospitals at Astorga and Villafranca.

Napoleon had attempted to speedily catch the British and force them to fight. He led the French army 200 miles (320 km) over 10 days by forced marches and in spite of winter blizzard conditions reached Astorga on 1 January with 80,000 men. Napoleon manoeuvred to cut Moore off from a retreat to Portugal. Moore had already planned that he would have to be ready to make a run for the coast. On 28 November Moore had ordered his Corunna contingent under Baird to embark from Vigo while the main British army was to fall back on Portugal but by 28 December he had decided to embark the whole army at Vigo. Abandoning Astorga on 30 December, he would manage to keep ahead of the pursuing French and avoid a major battle. Moore ordered Crawford and two brigades as well as the troop transport ships to the port of Vigo. Napoleon wrote to his brother Joseph on 31 December:

My vanguard is near Astorga; the English are running away as fast as they can... they are abhorred by everybody; they have carried off everything, and then maltreated and beaten the inhabitants. There could not have been a better sedative for Spain than to send an English army.

When it was clear that he could not bring Moore to battle, Napoleon left the pursuit of the British to Soult's corps with Michel Ney in support and took the bulk of the army, some 45,000 men, back to Madrid. Napoleon decided to leave Spain to attend to other pressing matters; the Austrians were about to declare war on France, and would soon invade Italy and Bavaria.

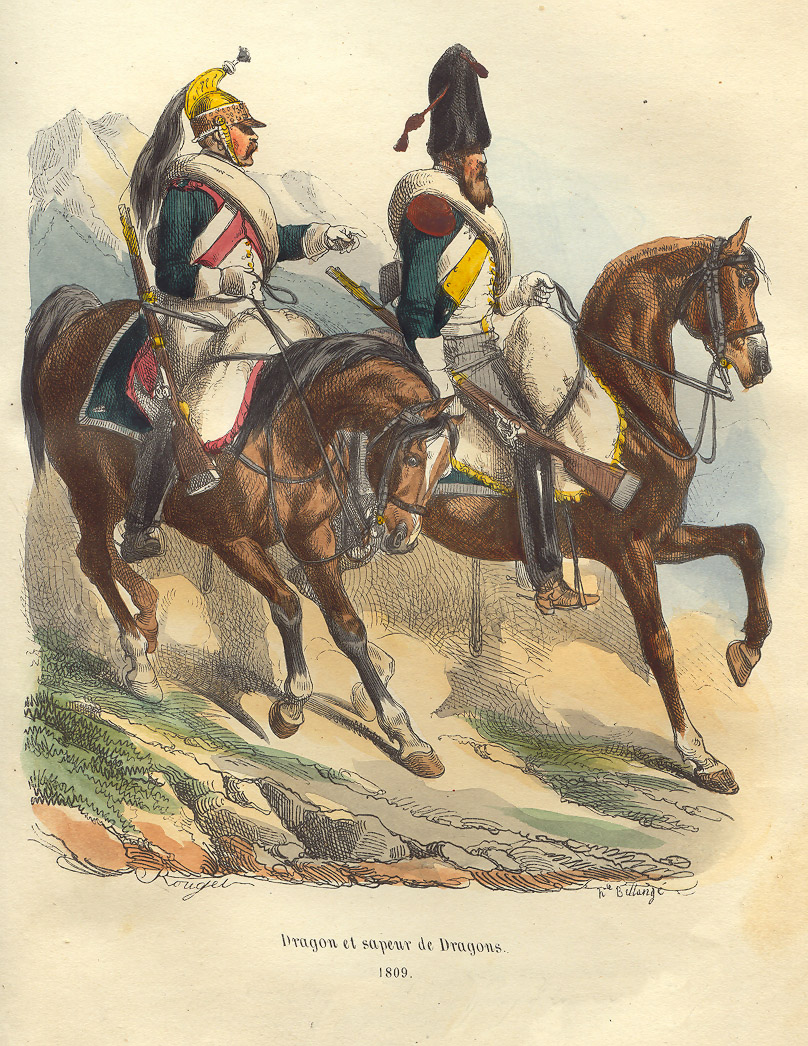
French dragoons by Hippolyte Bellangé

On several occasions, the discipline of Moore's army broke down; British troops looted Benavente on 28 December and hundreds of drunken soldiers were abandoned on 2 January at Bembibre and were captured or killed by pursuing French dragoons. Paget attempted to hang three British soldiers for looting in a Spanish town but was forced to abandon the executions after pursuing French troops neared. The French cavalry General Colbert, was killed while in close pursuit across the bridge at the village of Cacabelos by a long-range rifle shot fired by Thomas Plunket of the 95th Rifles after driving off the British 15th Hussars. Losses were about the same for the two units.

Moore made a stand before the old Roman town of Lugo on 6 January and offered battle but, initially, Soult's forces were too strung out. Over two days Soult concentrated his troops and tried to get Ney to send a division from Villa Franca del Bierzo but Ney sent few troops. By the 8th Soult was prepared for battle, but Moore, imagining Ney was outflanking him, slipped away that night, shooting 500 foundered horses and destroying artillery caissons and food stores. Now realizing he could not get to Vigo and fearing his army would disintegrate on the way, he ordered the transports to Betanzos Bay between Corunna and Ferrol and he headed for Corunna.

Rain storms and confusion caused the British main body to partially lose order and break up with thousands straggling. Some 500 British were captured by the pursuing French dragoons, with hundreds more stragglers captured by Franceschi's cavalry on the 10th and several hundred more on the 11th. The loss of troops between Lugo and Betanzos was greater than all of that of the preceding retreat. Eventually, on 11 January, the British main body reached the port of Corunna in northwest Spain, where they had hoped to find the fleet to take them back to England. They found Betanzos Bay empty and only 26 transports and two warships at Corunna. The rest of the 245 ships had been delayed by contrary winds only arriving at Vigo on the 8th and would not depart for Corunna until the 13th.

The French had also suffered severe fatigue and deprivation during their pursuit having to travel over ground already crossed by the British. The British rearguard had held off the pursuing French, allowing the rest of the British army to continue to withdraw, however the French cavalry had continually pressed them and prevented effective reconnaissance by the British cavalry. Soult's infantry had also had trouble keeping up and was badly strung out and most were well behind the cavalry which included the divisions of Armand Lebrun de La Houssaye, Jean Thomas Guillaume Lorge and Jean Baptiste Marie Franceschi-Delonne. Soult's three infantry divisions, commanded by Pierre Hugues Victoire Merle, Julien Augustin Joseph Mermet and Henri François Delaborde, and his artillery would arrive at Corunna piecemeal over the next few days.

=== Arrival of the armies before Corunna ===
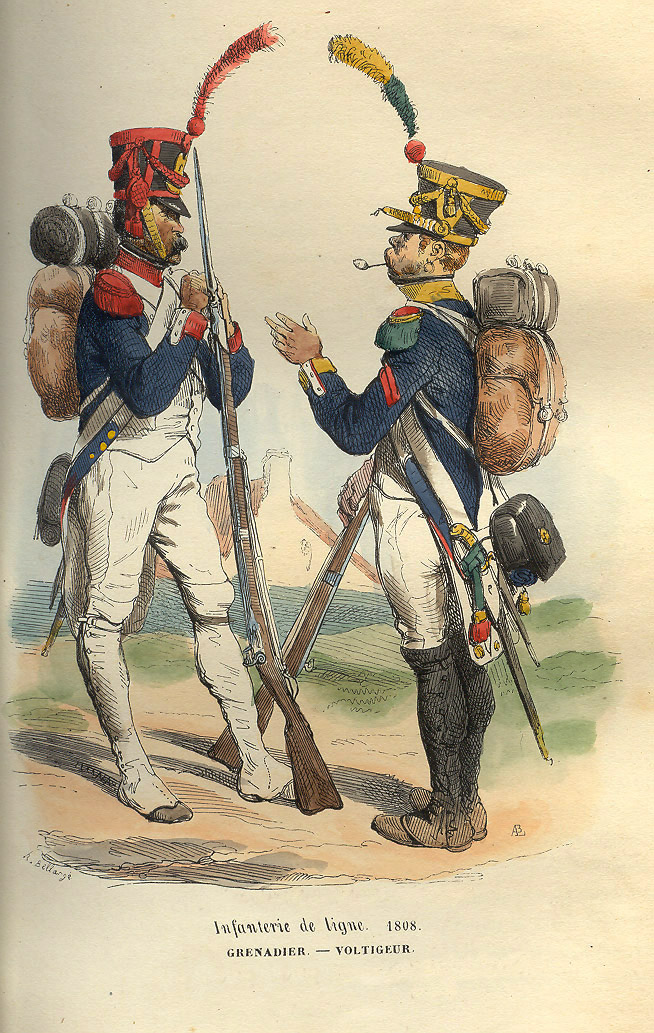
French Infantry by Hippolyte Bellangé

The British army arrived in Corunna on 11 January and there were found only the ships of the line, a small number of transport and hospital ships to which the many wounded were embarked. There was also a large quantity of badly needed military stores: 5,000 new muskets were issued to the troops, a vast amount of cartridges for re-equipping, numerous Spanish artillery pieces and plenty of food, shoes and other supplies.

The French army began to arrive the next day, building up strength as they arrived from the march. Soult's artillery arrived on 14 January. The long-awaited transport ships also arrived on the 14th and that evening the British evacuated their sick, some horses and most of the remaining field guns, cavalrymen and gunners. There was no intention by the British of garrisoning and holding on to Corunna as a future base with its extensive stores and certain support from the sea. (Note: Oman states "... arguments for attempting a defence of Galicia were more weighty than has been allowed.^{(See the arguments stated on Oman 1902, pp. 554–555)}".) The British then destroyed a portion of the enormous amount of military stores originally intended for the Spanish: nearly 12,000 barrels of powder, 300,000 cartridges in two magazines outside the town and 50 fortress guns and 20 mortars.

The British embarked nearly all their cannon and artillerists and, as the terrain was unsuitable for cavalry, all their cavalry troopers and a few healthy horses, but killed some 2,000 of the cavalry's horses. Moore now actually had the advantage in numbers in infantry, 15,000 to 12,000 and, with the rough ground much broken up by sunken roads and walls, Soult's cavalry would be of little use. The British were rearmed, well rested and well fed, in marked contrast to the oncoming French.

Moore had deployed his army to cover the evacuation by placing the main part of it on a ridge astride the road to Corunna, a mile and a half south of the harbour. A stronger position lay to the south but the British commander considered that he lacked the numbers to defend it properly and had to be content with placing outposts there to slow the approach of the French. The left flank was covered by the river Mero and the left and centre of the ridge was quite defensible. The western and lower end of this ridge was more vulnerable and could be swept by guns on the rocky heights of the loftier range opposite, and the ground further west consisted of more open terrain extending as far as Corunna which might provide the means of turning the whole position. Moore held two divisions back in reserve a little north and westwards in order to guard the right flank and to prevent a turning movement.

On 15 January French troops pushed back the British outposts on the higher range and gradually took up position there. A counterattack by British 5th Foot was repulsed with heavy loss. This engagement took place on the Heights of Palavea and Peñasquedo. Soult sited his 11 heavy guns upon the rocky outcrop from where they would be able to fire upon the British right. The task was very difficult and it was night before the guns had been dragged into position. Delaborde's division was posted on the right and Merle's in the centre with Mermet on the left. The light field guns of the French were distributed across the front of their position, however the broken ground, sunken roads and walls limited them to long range support. The French cavalry was deployed to the east of the line. For the British, Baird's division formed on the right and Hope's the left, each deploying a brigade en potence with Paget as the reserve at the village Airis.

== Battle ==
As day broke on 16 January the French were in position on the heights, and all through the morning both armies observed each across the valley between them. Moore planned to continue with the embarkation later that day if Soult did not attack. By afternoon Moore considered an attack unlikely and ordered the first divisions to make their way to the port; the rest of the army would follow at dusk, but shortly afterwards, at 2:00 pm, he learned that the French were attacking.

Soult's plan was to move against the strongly placed British infantry of the left and centre in order to contain it while the infantry division of Mermet attacked the more vulnerable British right above the village of Elviña. The cavalry was deployed further west near the more open country leading to Corunna. If the attacks succeeded they could seize the western end of the British lines and push on to cut off the bulk of the army from Corunna.

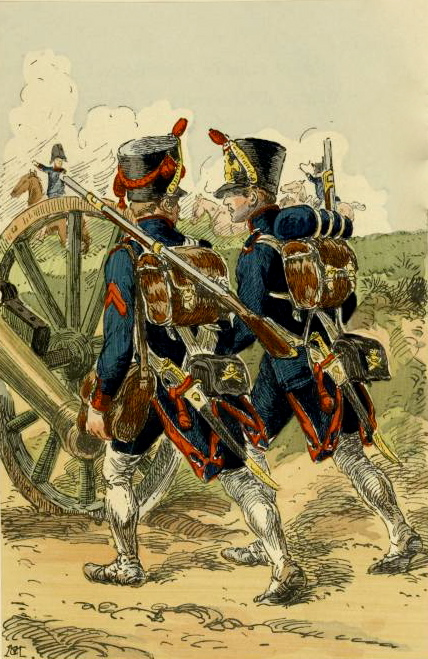
French Artillerymen 1809

Mermet's infantry advanced quickly and soon pushed the British picquets back, carrying the town of Elviña and attacking the heights beyond. The first French column divided into two with Gaulois' and Jardon's brigades attacking Baird front and flank, and the third French brigade pushing up the valley on the British right in an attempt to turn their flank with Lahoussaye's dragoons moving with difficulty over the broken ground and walls trying to cover the left of the French advance.

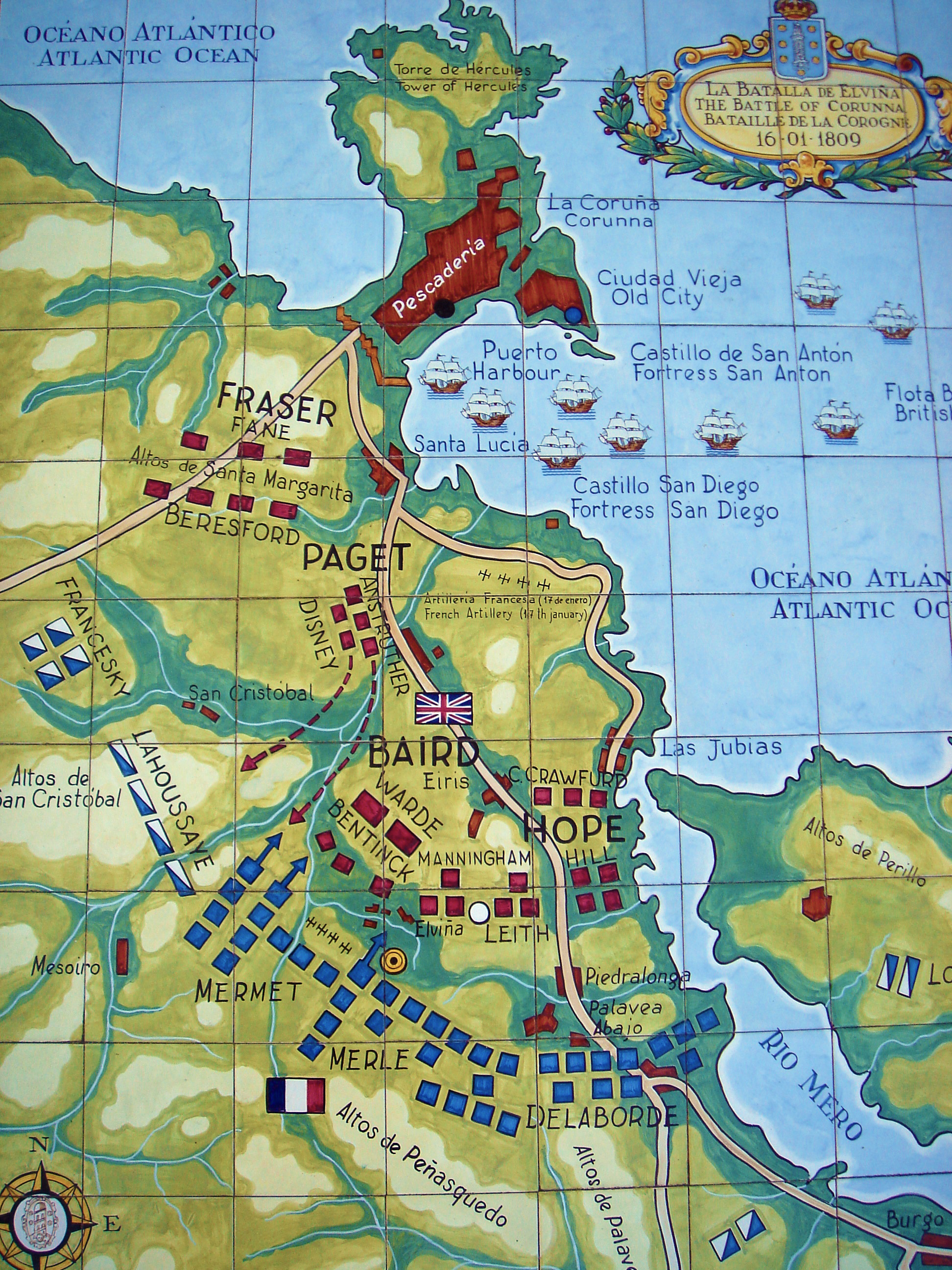
The positions of the armies at Corunna. The British are in red and the French in blue.

The fiercest fighting took place in and around Elviña as the possession of this village would change hands several times, and the British suffered particularly from the fire of the heavy artillery on the heights opposite. As the French attack broke through Elviña and came up the hill behind it, Moore sent in the 50th Foot and the 42nd (Black Watch) to stop the French infantry while the 4th Foot held the right flank of the British line. The ground around the village was broken up by numerous stone walls and hollow roads. Moore remained in this area to direct the battle, ordering the 4th Foot to fire down upon the flank of the second French column that was attempting the turning movement and calling up the reserve under Paget to meet it. The British advance carried beyond the village but some confusion among the British allowed Mermet's reserves to drive into and through Elviña again chasing the 50th and 42nd back up the slope. Moore called up his divisional reserve, some 800 men from two battalions of the Guards, and together with the 42nd they halted the French advance.

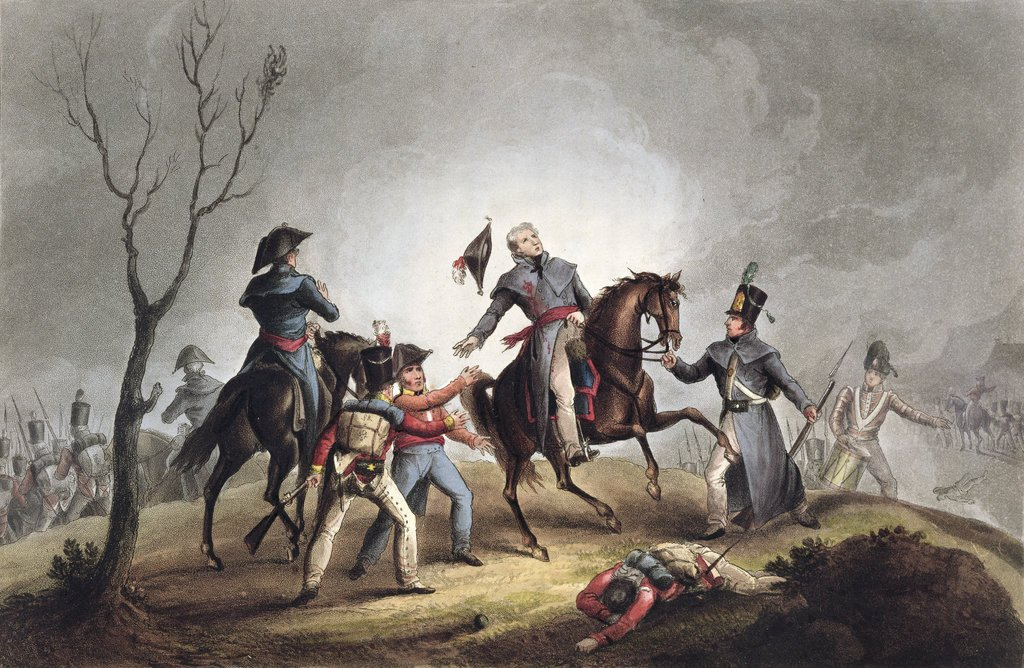
Death of Sir John Moore at the Battle of Corunna, derived from an engraving by Thomas Sutherland and aquatint by William Heath

The British commander had just rallied the 42nd that had fallen back from Elviña and had ordered the Guards to advance on the village when he was struck by a cannonball. He fell mortally wounded, struck "on the left shoulder, carrying it away with part of the collar-bone, and leaving the arm hanging only by the flesh and muscles above the armpit". He remained conscious, and composed, throughout the several hours of his dying. The second advance again drove the French back through Elviña. Mermet now threw in his last reserves with one of Merle's brigade attacking the east side of the village. This was countered by an advance by Manningham's brigade and a long fire-fight broke out between two British: the 3/1st and the 2/81st and two French regiments: the 2nd Légere and 36th Ligne of Reynaud's brigade. The 81st was forced out of the fight and relieved by the 2/59th and the fighting petered out here late in the day with both sides finally retiring.

For a time the British were without a leader until General John Hope took command as Baird was also seriously wounded. This hampered attempts at a counterattack in the crucial sector of Elviña, but the fighting continued unabated.

Further west the French cavalry pushed forward as part of the flank attack and made a few charges but they were impeded by the rough terrain. Lahoussaye dismounted some his Dragoons which fought as skirmishers but they were eventually driven back by the advance of the 95th Rifles, 28th Foot and 91st Foot of the British reserves. Franceschi's cavalry moved to flank the extreme right of the British attempting to cut them off at the gates of Corunna but were countered again by the terrain and Fraser's division drawn up on the Santa Margarita ridge which covered the neck of the peninsula and the gates. As Lahoussaye retired, Franceschi conformed with his movement. As per The History of the Rifle Brigade (by Sir William Cope, 1811–1892), the 95th attempted to assault the French left-wing position, but was unsuccessful, enjoying, however, the capture of 150 prisoners of war. The French, having brought forward all their reserves, were still in position at the head of the valley of the Monelos stream when the action came to an end. During the battle, this valley had been occupied by the 28th as a consequence of its counterattack against Lahoussaye's men.

Night brought an end to the fighting by which time the French attacks did not produce results and the opponents returned to their original positions; both sides holding much the same ground as before the fight. Practically, the battle for Elviña was inconclusive, with a part of the village remained under the French control. The French, like the British, decided to disengage "as if by mutual consent" because of the onset of night. A portion of Elviña was firmly occupied by the British, as well as some land previously occupied by Lahoussaye. The French seized a southern foothold in Pedralonga^{[es]} as well, a village that also saw a small battle that day. The northern sector of Pedralonga was under British control by the end.

== Aftermath ==
=== End of Corunna campaign ===
Command of the British army had passed to General Hope who decided to continue the embarkation rather than to attempt to hold their ground or attack Soult. At around 9:00 pm the British began to silently withdraw from their lines, leaving behind strong picquets who maintained watch-fires throughout the night.

At daybreak on 17 January the picquets were withdrawn behind the rearguard and went aboard ship; by morning most of the army had embarked. When Soult perceived that the British had left the ridge, he posted six guns on the heights above the southern end of the bay and by midday the French were able to fire upon the outlying ships. This caused panic amongst some of the transports, four of which ran aground and were then burned to prevent their capture. Fire from the warships then silenced the battery.

On 18 January, the British rearguard embarked as the Spanish garrison under General Alcedo "faithfully" held the citadel until the fleet was well out to sea before surrendering. (Note: Oman criticizes Alcedo for not putting up more of a fight for the town which the British themselves, having destroyed much of its defences, had just abandoned to its fate (Oman 1902, p. 596). Napier makes a similar criticism.) The city of Corunna was taken by the French, two Spanish regiments surrendering along with 500 horses and considerable military stores captured including numerous cannon, 20,000 muskets, hundreds of thousands of cartridges and tons of gunpowder. A week later Soult's forces captured Ferrol, an even greater arsenal and a major Spanish naval base across the bay, taking eight ships of the line, three with 112 guns, two with 80, one 74, two 64s, three frigates and numerous corvettes, as well as a large arsenal with over 1,000 cannon, 20,000 new muskets from England and military stores of all kinds.

As a result of the battle the British suffered around 900 men dead or wounded. Unable to embark the many horses in the army, most of the nearly 2,000 cavalry horses and as many as 4,000 more horses of the artillery and train were slaughtered to prevent them from falling into French hands. Total British losses in the Corunna campaign (October 1808 – January 1809) may have ranged from 4,500 to 9,000 men. The French lost around 1,000 men killed, wounded or captured in the battle. The most notable casualty was Lieutenant-General Moore, who survived long enough to learn of his success. Sir David Baird, Moore's second in command, was seriously wounded earlier in the battle and had to retire from the field. In addition two of Mermet's three brigadiers were also casualties: Gaulois was shot dead and Lefebvre badly hurt.

On the morning of the battle 4,035 British were listed sick, a few hundred of these were too sick to embark and were left behind. Two more transports were lost with about 300 troops mostly from the King's German Legion. By the time the army returned to England four days later some 6,000 were ill, with the sick returns listed at Portsmouth and Plymouth alone as 5,000.

Within ten days the French had captured two fortresses containing an immense amount of military matériel which, with more resolution, could have been defended against the French for many months. Ney and his corps reinforced with two cavalry regiments took on the task of occupying Galicia. Soult was able to refit his corps, which had been on the march and fighting since 9 November, with the captured stores so that, with half a million cartridges and 3,000 artillery rounds carried on mules (the roads not being suitable for wheeled transport), and with his stragglers now closed up on the main body, he was able to begin his march on Portugal on 1 February with a strength of 19,000 infantry, 4,000 cavalry and 58 guns.

== Analysis ==
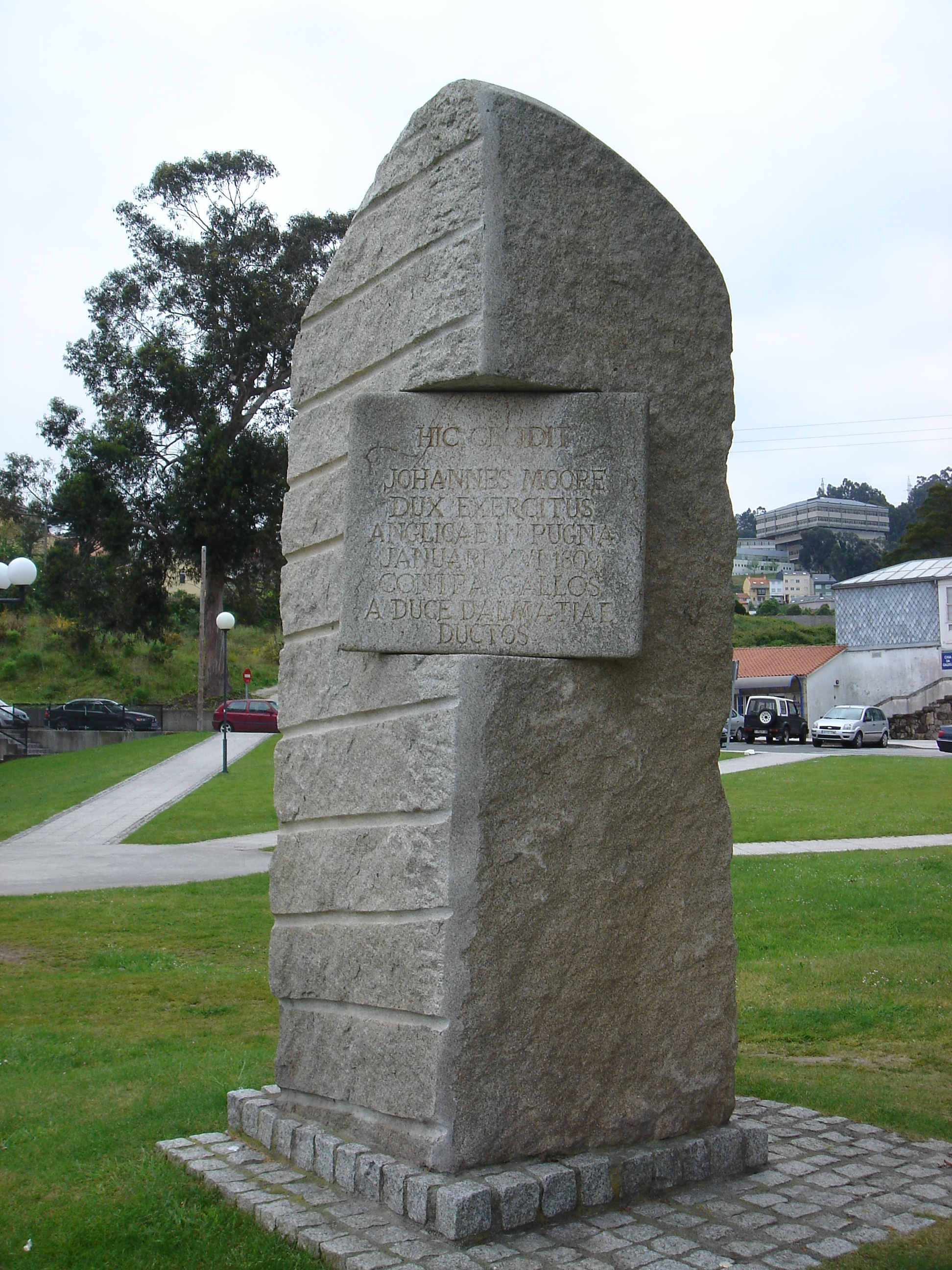
Moore's monolith in the old battlefield, now a campus of the University of Corunna

The British army had been sent into Spain to aid in expelling the French, but they had been forced into a humiliating retreat in terrible winter conditions that wrought havoc with health and morale and resulted in the army degenerating into a rabble. In his authoritative account of the battle, the English historian Christopher Hibbert states: "It was all very well to talk of the courage and endurance of the troops but of what use were these virtues alone when pitted against the genius of Napoleon? 35,000 men had crossed the Spanish frontier against him; 8,000 had not returned. We were unworthy of our great past." Some British of the day similarly viewed Corunna as a defeat: according to The Times, "The fact must not be disguised... that we have suffered a shameful disaster."

The historian Charles Oman contends that Marshal Soult's attack at Corunna provided Moore and his men with the opportunity to redeem their honour and reputation through their defensive victory, by which means the army was saved though at the cost of the British general's life. This view was echoed by the Count of Toreno, a contemporary of Moore's and author of the classic Spanish history of the war. John Fortescue states: "...it would be absurd to say that either side gained a great victory."; though he also says that the British soldiers were satisfied with the outcome of the battle, which could not be said about the French troops. Moore was buried wrapped in a military cloak in the ramparts of the town. The funeral is commemorated in a well-known poem by Charles Wolfe (1791–1823), "The Burial of Sir John Moore after Corunna".

Charles Esdaile, in The Peninsular War: A New History, writes: "In military terms, Moore's decision to retreat was therefore probably sensible enough but in other respects it was a disaster ... Having failed to appear in time ... then allowed Madrid to fall without a shot, the British now seemed to be abandoning Spain altogether." Also, "Even worse than the physical losses suffered by the allies was the immense damage done to Anglo-Spanish relations. ... de la Romana ... openly accusing Moore of betrayal and bad faith." Finally, "... the occupation (by the French) of the most heavily populated region in the whole of Spain".

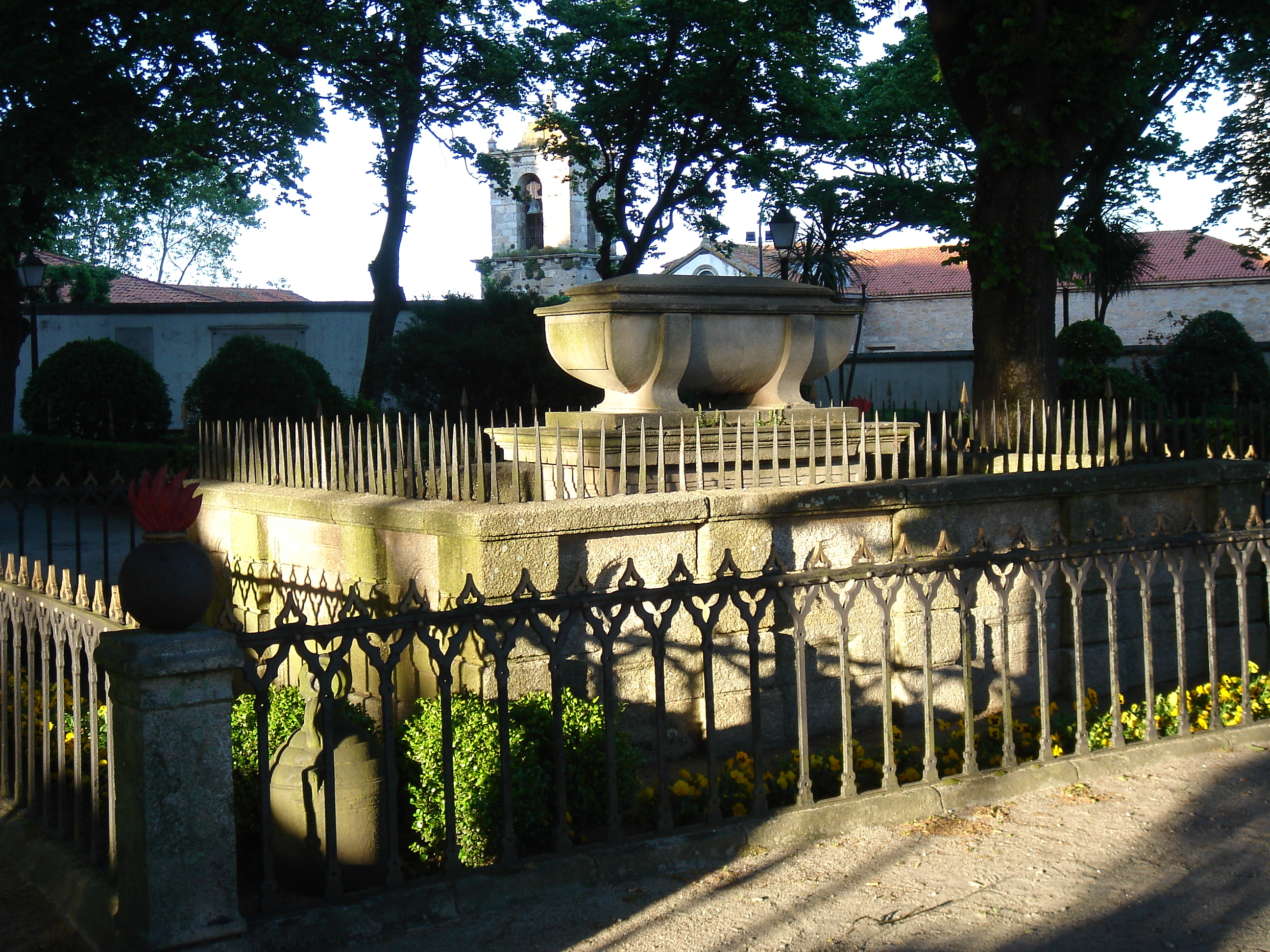
Moore's tomb in San Carlos Garden at A Coruña

Chandler states, the British Army had been "... compelled to conduct a precipitate retreat and evacuate by sea." Also, "Madrid and the Northern half of Spain were under occupation by French troops". Fremont-Barnes, in The Napoleonic Wars: The Peninsular War 1807–1814, writes that the then British Foreign Secretary Canning: " ... privately condemned Moore's failed campaign in increasingly stronger terms," while in public he " ... in the great British tradition of characterizing defeat as victory, insisted that although Moore's army had been pushed out of Spain his triumph at the battle of Corunna had left 'fresh laurels blooming upon our brows'".

A more charitable view is offered by W. H. Fitchett in How England Saved Europe: "... it is also a dramatic justification of Moore's strategy that he had drawn a hostile force so formidable into a hilly corner of Spain, thus staying its southward rush". Napier similarly speculates: "The second sweep that [Napoleon] was preparing to make when Sir John Moore's march called off his attention from the south would undoubtedly have put him in possession of the remaining great cities of the Peninsula."

Nevertheless, back in England the reaction to news of the Battle of Corunna and the safe evacuation of the army was a storm of criticism over Moore's handling of the campaign, while back in Corunna his adversary Marshal Soult took care of Moore's grave and ordered a monument to be raised in his memory.

== See also ==
- Timeline of the Peninsular War

== Bibliography ==
- Balagny, Dominique Eugène Paul (1906), Campaign de l'empereur Napoléon en Espagne (1808–1809), vol. IV, Paris; The Online Books Page: Campaign de l'empereur Napoléon en Espagne (1808–1809)
- Belmas, J. (1836), Journaux des sièges faits ou soutenus par les Français dans la péninsule de 1807 à 1814, vol. 1, Paris, p. 55, OCLC 493456886
- Blakeney, Robert (1905), Rouse, W. H. D. (ed.), The retreat to Corunna, London
- Bourrienne, Louis Antoine Fauvelet de; Phipps, Ramsay Weston (1892), Memoirs of Napoleon Bonaparte, p. xlix
- Brown, Steve (October 2015). "British Losses in the Corunna Campaign" (PDF). Napoleon Series. Waterloo Association.
- Castex, Jean-Claude (2013). Combats franco-anglais des guerres du premier empire. Editions P.O.
- Chandler, David G. (1995), The Campaigns of Napoleon, New York: Simon & Schuster, ISBN 0-02-523660-1
- Chandler, David G. (1996), The Campaigns of Napoleon, London: Weidenfeld & Nicolson, ISBN 0-297-74830-0
- Churchill, Winston (1958), A History of the English-speaking Peoples: The age of revolution, vol. 3, Dodd, Mead, pp. 257, 260
- Cross, Arthur Lyon (1914), A History of England and Greater Britain, Macmillan, p. 854
- Dunn-Pattison, Richard Phillipson (1909), Napoleon's Marshals, Boston: Brown & Company
- Duffy, Michael (2011), "Chapter 3", in Elleman, Bruce A.; Paine, S. C. M. (eds.), Naval Power and Expeditionary Warfare: Peripheral Campaigns and New Theatres of Naval Warfare, New York, ISBN 978-0-203-83321-6
- Esdaile, Charles (2003a) [2002], The Peninsular War, Penguin Books, ISBN 0-14-027370-0
- Esdaile, Charles (2003), The Peninsular War: A New History, New York: Palgrave Macmillan, ISBN 1403962316
- Fitchett, William Henry (1900), How England Saved Europe: The story of the Great War: The war in the Peninsula, vol. III, London: New York, C. Scribner's sons, OCLC 220800886
- Fortescue, John (1910), A History of the British Army, vol. VI 1807–1809, MacMillan and Company, OCLC 312880647
- Fremont-Barnes, Gregory (2002), The Napoleonic Wars: The Peninsular War 1807–1814, Essential Histories, No 17, Osprey, ISBN 1841763705
- Gates, David (2002) [1986], The Spanish Ulcer: A History of the Peninsular War, Pimlico, ISBN 0-7126-9730-6
- Gay, Susan E. (1903), Old Falmouth, London, p. 231
- Glover, Michael (2001) [1974], The Peninsular War 1807–1814: A Concise Military History, Penguin Classic Military History, ISBN 0-14-139041-7
- Hamilton, Frederick William (1874), The Origin and History of the First Or Grenadier Guards, vol. II, London, OCLC 59415892
- Harris, Benjamin (1848). Recollections of Rifleman Harris, Old 95th, London: H. Hurst, 27, King William Street, Charing Cross. OCLC 22331925.
- Haythornthwaite, Philip (2001), Corunna 1809, Campaign 83, Osprey Publishing, ISBN 1-85532-968-9
- Hibbert, Christopher (1961), Corunna, London: Batsford, OCLC 602870980
- Hodge, Carl Cavanaugh (2007), Encyclopedia of the Age of Imperialism, 1800–1914, Greenwood, p. lxxiii
- Howard, M. R. (May 1991), "Medical aspects of Sir John Moore's Corunna Campaign, 1808–1809", Journal of the Royal Society of Medicine, 84 (5): 300, doi:10.1177/014107689108400517, PMC 1293231, PMID 2041010
- Hugo, Par A., ed. (1838), France militaire. histoire des armées françaises de terre et de mer de 1792 à 1837 (in French), vol. 4, Paris, pp. 110–111
- Knight, Charles (1861), The Popular History of England, London, p. 506
- Napier, William (1873), History of the war in the Peninsula and the south of France, from the year 1807 to the year 1814, New York: D. & J. Sadlier
- Neale, Adam; Hopetoun, John Hope (4th earl); Malcolm, John; Rocca, Albert Jean Michel (1828), Memorials of the Late War, vol. I, Edinburgh, OCLC 9981233
- Neale, Adam (1809), "Appendix", Letters from Portugal and Spain: An Account of the Operations of the Armies..., London: Richard Philips, pp. 100, 102
- Oman, Charles (1899), A history of England: Division 3 – From A.D. 1688 to A.D. 1885, London and New York: Edward Arnold, p. 616
- Oman, Charles (1902), A History of the Peninsular War: 1807–1809, vol. 1, Oxford: Clarendon Press, OCLC 1539767
- Oman, Charles (1903), A History of the Peninsular War: Jan. – Sep. 1809, vol. 2, Oxford: Clarendon Press
- Pococke, Thomas (1819), Howell, John (ed.), Journal of a Soldier of the 71st Regiment, Edinburgh, OCLC 16295400
- Queipo de Llano (Count of Toreno), José María (1835), Historia del levantamiento, guerra y revolución de España (PDF), Centro de Estudios Políticos y Constitucionales (published 2008), archived from the original (PDF) on 4 April 2018
- Richardson, Hubert N. B. (1920), A dictionary of Napoleon and his times, New York, OCLC 154001
- Robson, Catherine (February 2009), Eberle-Sinatra, Michael; Felluga, Dino Franco; Flint, Kate (eds.), "Memorization and Memorialization: 'The Burial of Sir John Moore after Corunna'", Romanticism and Victorianism on the Net (53), doi:10.7202/029901ar, ISSN 1916-1441
- Sandler, Stanley (2002), Ground warfare: An International Encyclopedia, vol. 1, ABC-CLIO
- Sarrazin, Jean (1815), History of the War in Spain and Portugal from 1807 to 1814, Henry Colburn, p. 358–359
- Stephens, Henry Morse (1900), Revolutionary Europe, 1789–1815, London, p. 271
- Tone, John Lawrence — of The Georgia Institute of Technology (March 2004), "Review of The Peninsular War: A New History by Charles Esdaile", H-France Review, 4 (30): 109–111, ISSN 1553-9172

Preceded by Battle of Uclés (1809)	Napoleonic Wars; Battle of Corunna	Succeeded by Battle of Valls
