= Portrait of Sir John Moore =

Painting by Thomas Lawrence

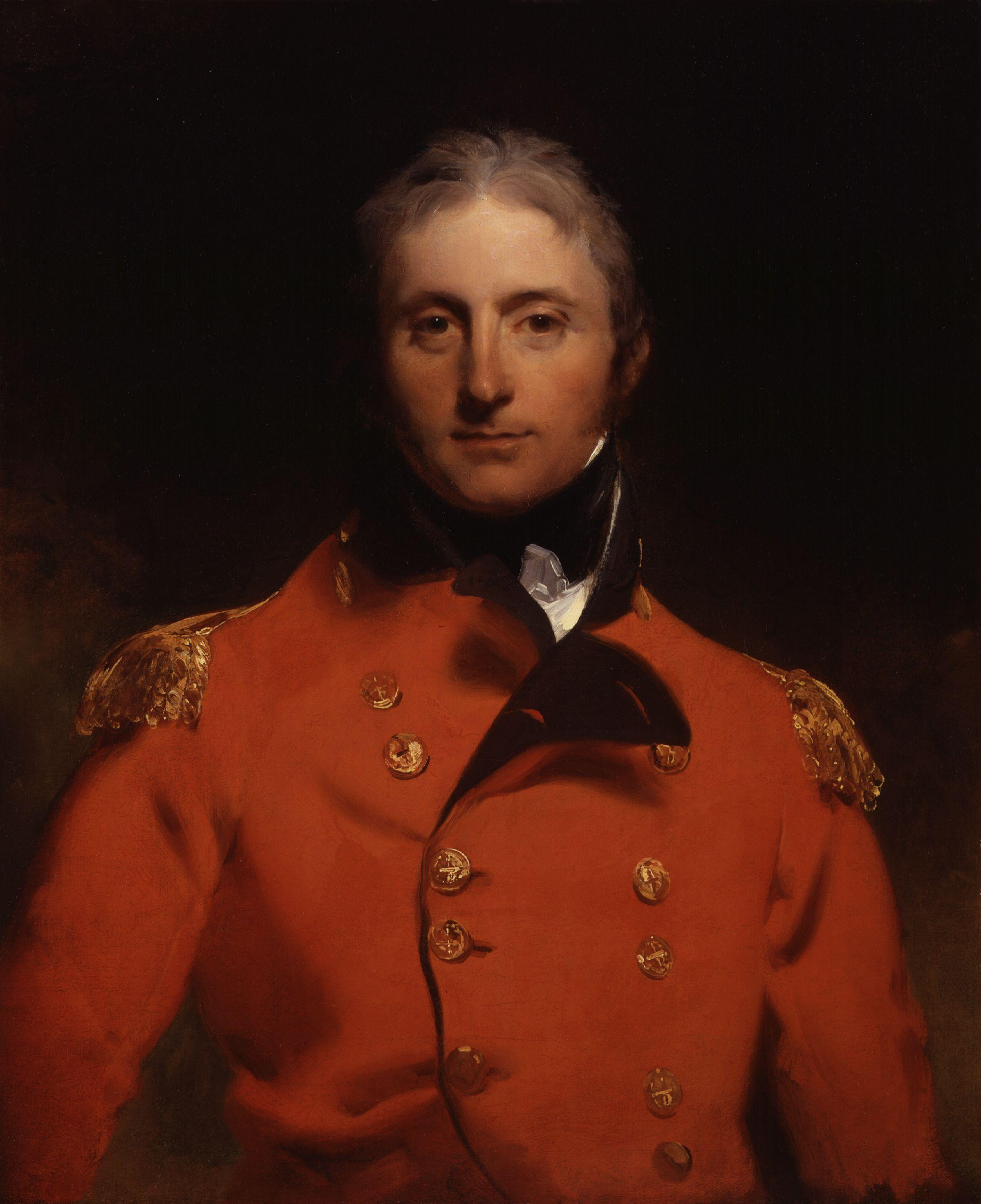
- Artist: Thomas Lawrence
- Year: 1800–1804
- Type: Oil on canvas, portrait
- Dimensions: 74.9 cm × 62.2 cm (29.5 in × 24.5 in)
- Location: National Portrait Gallery; London

Portrait of Sir John Moore is a portrait painting by the British artist Thomas Lawrence of the Scottish army officer Sir John Moore, painted between 1800 and 1804.

== History and description ==
Moore joined the army in 1776 during the American War of Independence and served in multiple subsequent campaigns. He is particularly known for his Innovations in light infantry training. In 1808 he commanded British forces in Spain during the early stages of the Peninsular War. Forced to retreat in the face of large French forces during the onset of winter, he successfully evacuated his troops but was fatally wounded at the Battle of Corunna. Now a popular hero in Britain, his image was widely circulated and an engraving was made of Lawrence's work by Charles Turner. Arthur Wellesley succeeded Moore as commander of the British Army in the Iberian Peninsular.

Lawrence emerged as one of Britain's leading portraitists in the 1790s. He portrays Moore in his uniform of a major general in a plain redcoat without decorations. The painting is now in the collection of the National Portrait Gallery in London having been donated by Moore's great-grandniece in 1898. Turner's mezzotints are also in the gallery's collection. A slightly later version done by Lawrence for General Robert Brownrigg shows Moore wearing a Lieutenant General's uniform and showing him with the Order of the Bath and is now at the National Army Museum in Chelsea.

== See also ==
- The Battle of Alexandria, an 1802 work by Philip James de Loutherbourg with Moore amongst the officers portrayed.
- Portrait of the Duke of Wellington, an 1815 painting by Lawrence of Moore's successor in the Peninsular.

== Bibliography ==
- Davies, Huw J. The Wandering Army: The Campaigns that Transformed the British Way of War. Yale University Press, 2022.
- Fletcher, Charles Robert Leslie . Historical Portraits, 1700–1850, Volume 2. Clarendon Press, 1919.
- Levey, Michael. Sir Thomas Lawrence. Yale University Press, 2005.
- Macdonald, Janet. Sir John Moore: The Making of a Controversial Hero. Pen and Sword, 2016.
