= Battle of Palavea =

1809 engagement during the Peninsular War

Engagement at Palavea
- Part of the Peninsular War
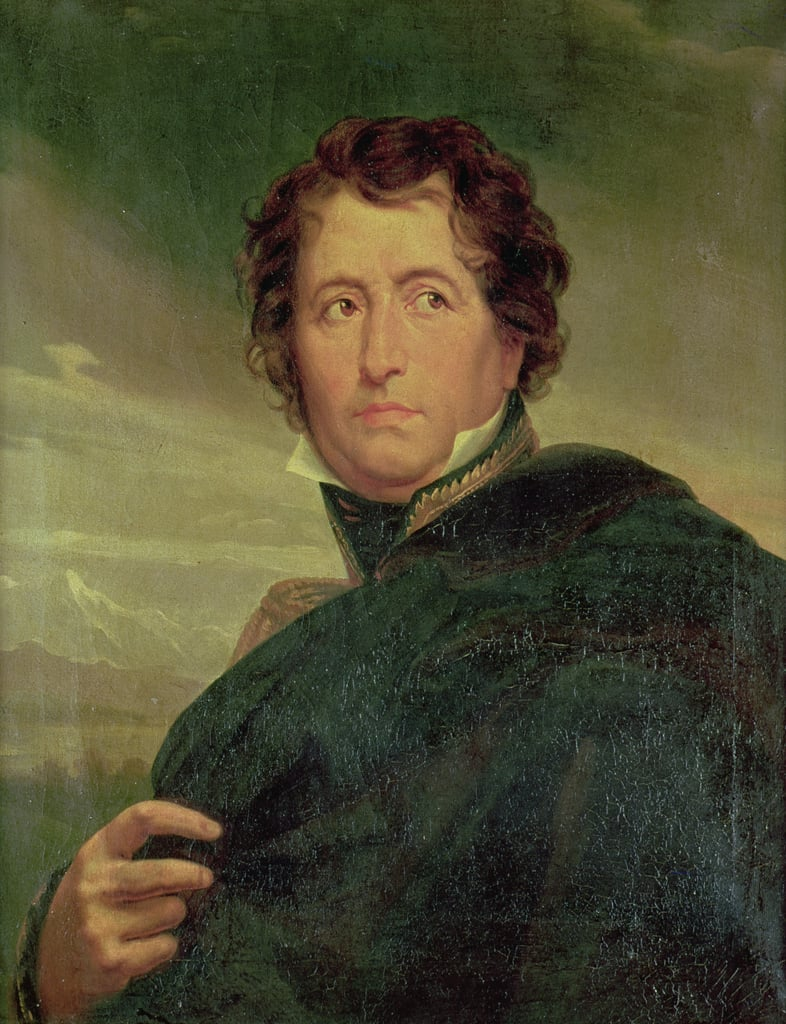
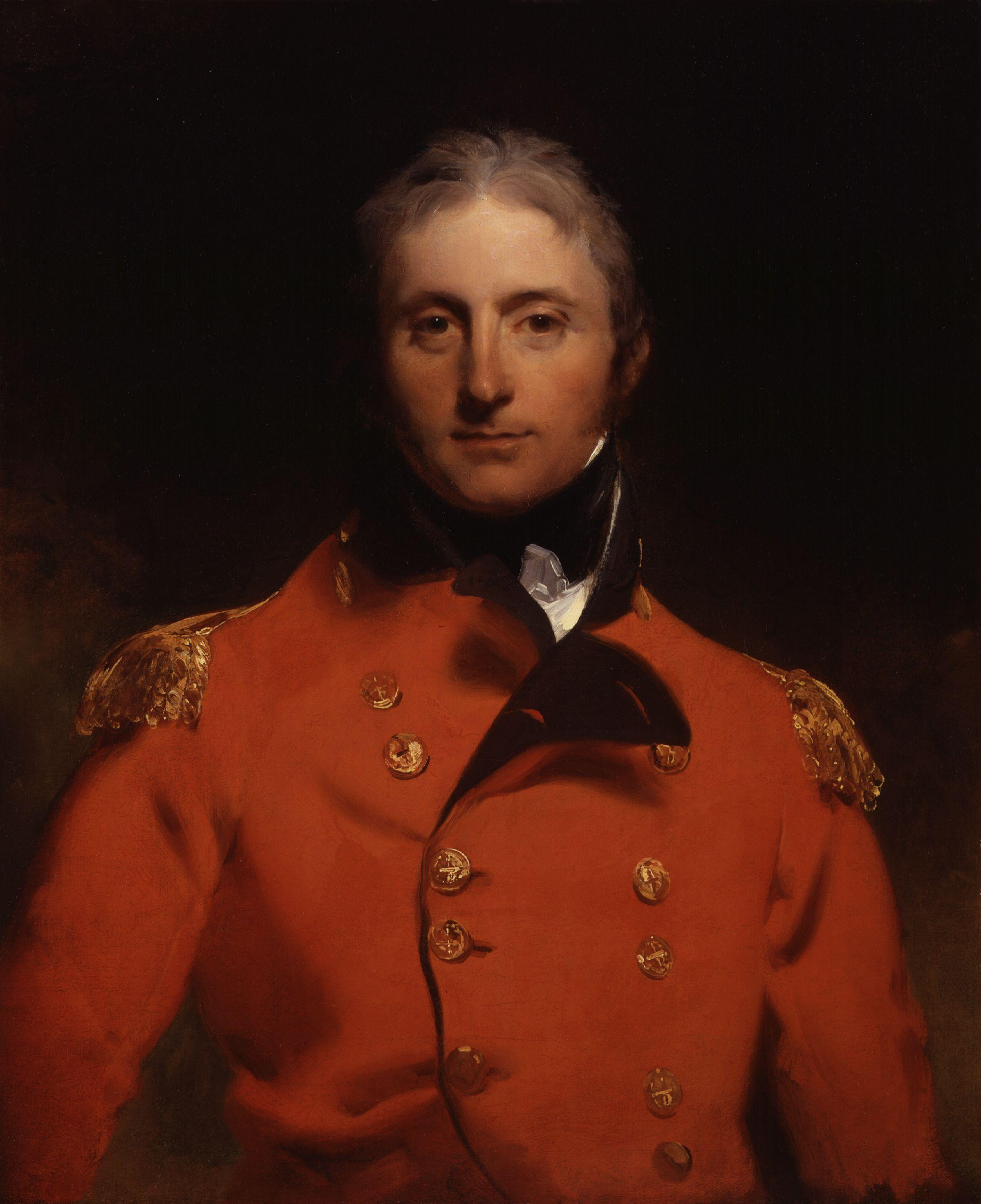
- Soult (left) and Moore (right)
Date	15 January 1809
Location	Palavea^{[gl]}, Galicia, Spain
Result	French victory
Territorial changes	The British abandon their foothold on the Palavea and Peñasquedo Heights ahead of the French attack on the 16th.

Belligerents
France	United Kingdom

Commanders and leaders
Soult	Moore

Strength
- See the article Battle of Corunna

Casualties and losses
approx. 100 dead or wounded	"Considerable" (more than 100 dead or wounded)

The engagement at Palavea was fought between the armed forces of the French Empire and the United Kingdom under the lead of Jean-de-Dieu Soult and John Moore, respectively. This battle occurred near the village of Palavea^{[gl]} on 15 January 1809 in the course of the Peninsular War, part of the larger "Great French War". The Palavea encounter was the precursor to the Battle of Corunna. At Palavea, Soult's troops managed to capture and consolidate the high ground, thus creating a foothold for an attack on Pedralonga and Elviña, which occurred the following day during the Battle of Corunna.

== Description ==
=== Prelude ===
After his grueling retreat, Moore prepared to head to the ocean, as the fleet had arrived to retrieve him. He had his units stretched as far as the heights of Palavea and Peñasquedo with the intention of securing the embarkation. Soult intended to capture these positions on the 15th. Thus the engagement began.

=== Battle ===
By Soult's instructions, Merle and Mermet's infantry, supported by Lorge and La Houssaye's dragoons, moved to attack the British outposts, which were located in the mountain positions of Palavea and Peñasquedo, and drove them out. Three companies of French voltigeurs, thus enforced on the heights and later supported by horse artillery, engaged the British 5th Foot on the spot. In an attempt to seize the French artillery, the 5th was surprised by voltigeurs firing from behind a wall. The engagement cost the regiment its Colonel Mackenzie and forced a British retreat under heavy fire.

=== Aftermath ===
As Moore's forward units were pushed from the high ground, Merle and Mermet's divisions seized the heights of Palavea and Peñasquedo. They were joined the next afternoon by Delaborde's division. 10 heavy French cannons were placed on the Heights of Peñasquedo, ready to bombard Elviña. On the 16th, Soult surveyed the field of the upcoming battle from the Heights of Palavea and Peñasquedo.
