= The Landing of British Troops at Aboukir =

Painting by Philip James de Loutherbourg

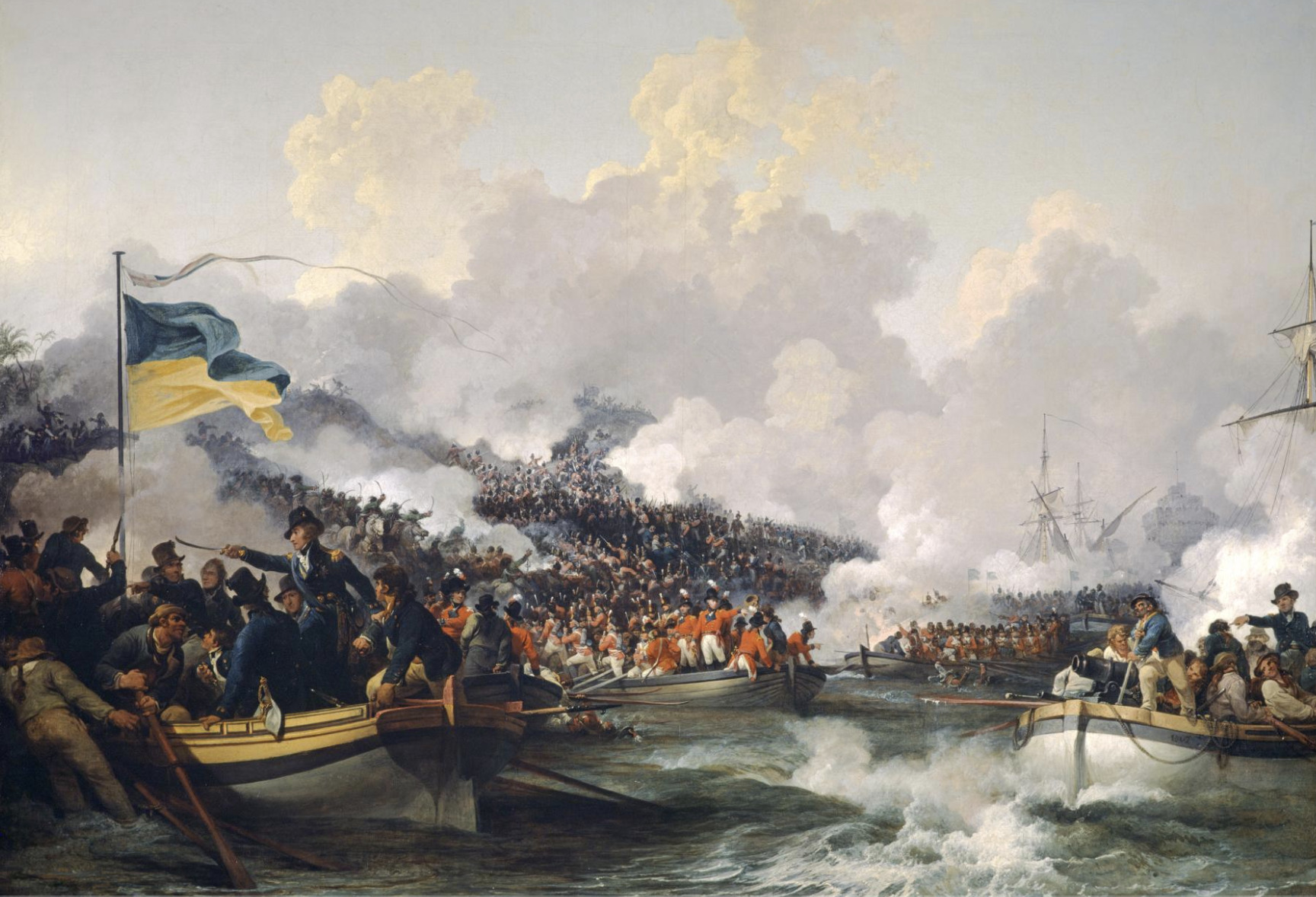
- Artist: Philip James de Loutherbourg
- Year: 1802
- Type: Oil on canvas, history painting
- Dimensions: 106.4 cm × 152.8 cm (41.9 in × 60.2 in)
- Location: Scottish National Gallery, Edinburgh

The Landing of British Troops at Aboukir is an oil on canvas history painting by the French-born British artist Philip James de Loutherbourg, from 1802.

== History and description ==
It depicts the Battle of Abukir fought on 8 March 1801 during the French invasion of Egypt. British forces led by Ralph Abercromby made an amphibious landing, but came under intense fire from French troops. The British took casualties, but made a successful landing and two weeks later won a further victory at the Battle of Alexandria. Although Abercromby does not appear in the scene himself, it features depictions of the Royal Navy officer Sidney Smith and the British Army officer Eyre Coote.

The work was displayed at the Royal Academy's Summer Exhibition of 1805 at Somerset House. The engraver Luigi Schiavonetti produced a print based on the painting in 1804. Today the painting is in the collection of the Scottish National Gallery in Edinburgh, having been acquired in 1986. Loutherbourg produced The Battle of Alexandria, a companion piece featuring another battle from the Egyptian campaign which is also in the collection.

== Bibliography ==
- Clifford, Timothy (2005). Choice: Twenty-one Years of Collecting for Scotland. National Galleries of Scotland. ISBN 1903278732.
- Mallinson, Allan (2009). The Making of the British Army. Random House. ISBN 9780593051085.
- Reid, Stuart (2021). Egypt 1801: The End of Napoleon's Eastern Empire. Frontline Books. ISBN 9781526758460.
- Russell, Gillian; Ramsey, Neil, eds. (2015). Tracing War in British Enlightenment and Romantic Culture. Springer. ISBN 9781137474308.
