= The Battle of Alexandria (painting) =

Painting by Philip James de Loutherbourg

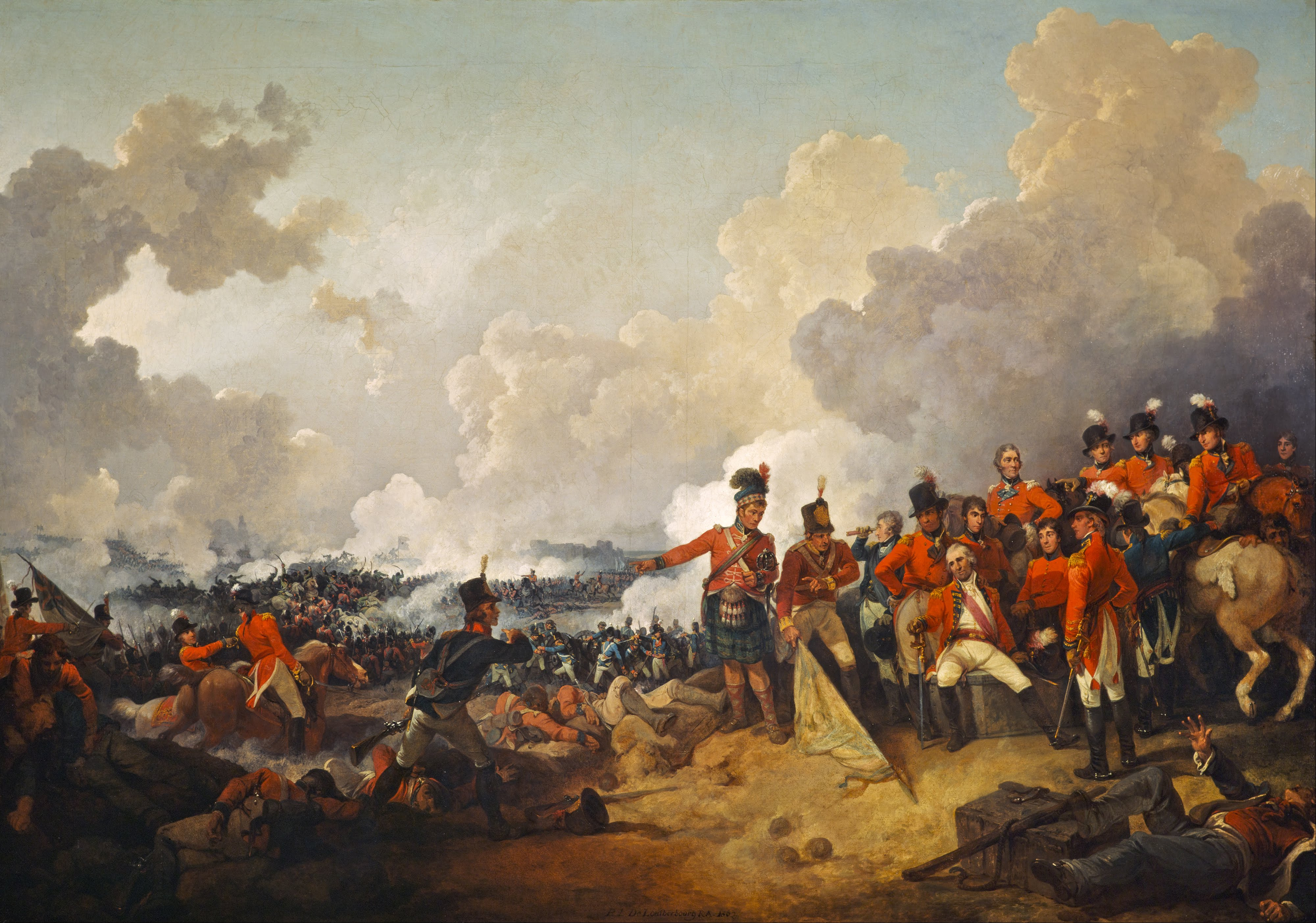
- Artist: Philip James de Loutherbourg
- Year: 1802
- Medium: Oil on canvas
- Dimensions: 106.60 cm × 152.60 cm (41.97 in × 60.08 in)
- Location: Scottish National Gallery, Edinburgh

The Battle of Alexandria is an oil on canvas history painting by the French-born British artist Philip James de Loutherbourg, from 1802. It is held at the Scottish National Gallery, in Edinburgh.

== History and description ==
The artist was well known for his scenes of naval and land battles. He set this work around the Battle of Alexandria in March 1801, when a British army allied to the Ottoman Empire defeated French forces that had invaded Egypt under Napoleon Bonaparte three years earlier.

Reminiscent of the battle scenes popularised by Benjamin West's Death of General Wolfe thirty years earlier, the painting focuses on the British high command while the battle rages in the background. The British commander Ralph Abercromby, an experienced Scottish general, has been fatally wounded and is shown slumped back. Gathered around him are various other senior officers including his successor the Irish general John Hely-Hutchinson as well as Robert Anstruther, John Moore, John Abercromby, Lord Ludlow, Eyre Coote and the naval officer Sir Sidney Smith. Hely-Hutchinson succeeded him as commander and oversaw the successful Siege of Cairo that ended with a complete French surrender in Egypt.

The work was displayed at the Royal Academy's Summer Exhibition of 1805 at Somerset House. It is now in the collection of the National Galleries of Scotland, having been purchased in 1986. Another artist Charles Orme also notably depicted the battle.

== See also ==
- The Landing of British Troops at Aboukir, an 1802 companion piece by Loutherbourg featuring another battle from the campaign

== Bibliography ==
- Dziennik, Matthew P. The Fatal Land: War, Empire, and the Highland Soldier in British America. Yale University Press, 2015.
- Nester, William R. Titan: The Art of British Power in the Age of Revolution and Napoleon. University of Oklahoma Press, 2016
- Reid, Stuart. Egypt 1801: The End of Napoleon's Eastern Empire. Frontline Books, 2021.
