= Jean Sarrazin =

French general

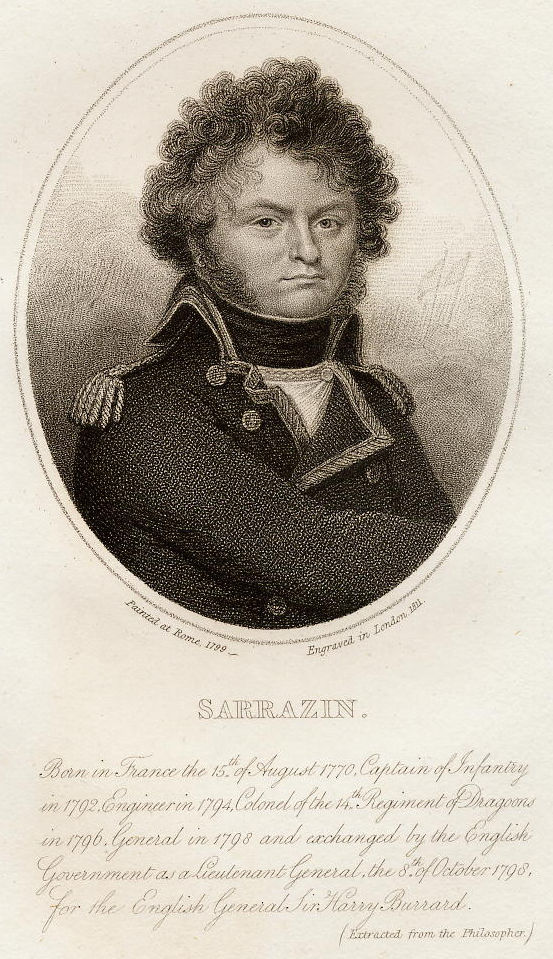
Sarrazin in 1799.

Jean Sarrazin (15 August 1770 – 11 November 1848) was a French general during the Revolutionary and Napoleonic Wars.

Born at Penne, Sarrazin joined the dragoons at sixteen and was rapidly promoted after 1792. He became adjutant-general of the Army of Sambre-et-Meuse in Italy in 1794, and was promoted to the rank of brigadier on 23 August 1798. He was a leader of the French expedition to support the Irish rebels in 1798, and distinguished himself at the Battle of Castlebar. Although intelligent and brave, his career was several times set back by his irascibility and vanity.

On 10 June 1810, Sarrazin went over to the British and revealed French weaknesses. Condemned in absentia to death by a conseil de guerre, (Note: For the conseil de guerre system, see Charles H. Hammond, Jr., "The French Revolution and the Enlightening of Military Justice".) he did not return to France until the Bourbon Restoration. He offered his services to Napoléon Bonaparte during the Hundred Days, but was thrown in prison. Pardoned in 1822, he went into exile in London and then Brussels, where he died.

== Selected publications ==
- Reply of General Sarrazin to the narrative made by General Clarke, minister of war, to General Bonaparte. London: Printed for the author by R. Juigné. 1810.
- Confession du Général Buonaparté à l'abbé Maury &c. &c. dédiée au Général Kléber par le Général Sarrazin. Egerton. 1811.
  - Confession of General Buonaparte to the abbé Maury, : &c. &c. dedicated to General Kleber / by General Sarrazin and ornamented with a portrait of Gen. Kleber, painted at Paris by Guérin, and engraved at London by Heath. Tr. from the French. London: Printed for the author, by R. Juigné, and sold by N. L. Pannier. 1811.
- Memorial of General Sarrazin. London: Printed for the author by Davidson. 1811.
- The Philosopher. London: Printed for the author by Davidson. 1812.
- Histoire de la guerre d'Espagne et de Portugal, de 1807 à 1814. Par M. Sarrazin ... Ornée de la carte d'Espagne et de Portugal, où sont tracées les marches des armées française, anglaise et espagnole, dressée par M. Lapie. Paris: J. G. Dentu. 1814.
  - History of the war in Spain and Portugal, from 1807 to 1814. Published by E. Edward; J. Maxwell, printer. 1815.
- Histoire de la guerre de Russie et d'Allemagne, depuis le passage du Niémen, juin 1812, jusqu'au passage du Rhin, novembre 1813; par M. Sarrazin ... Ornée d'une carte où sont tracées les marches de l'armée française; dressée par M. Lapie. Napoleon pamphlets, v. 21, no. 1. Paris: Rosa. 1815.
- Histoire de la guerre de vingt-quatre ans, du 20 avril 1792 jusquʼau 20 novembre 1815; ou Le général Bonaparte démasqué; par le général Sarrazin. Bruxelles: Lʼauteur. 1840.
- Descente des français en Irlande, 1798 / J. Sarrazin, J.-L. Jobit, L.-O. Fontaine; édition établie par Pierre Joannon. Paris: La Vouivre. 1998.
