= Douglas Haig, 1st Earl Haig =

British field marshal (1861–1928)

Field Marshal The Right Honourable The Earl Haig KT GCB OM GCVO KCIE
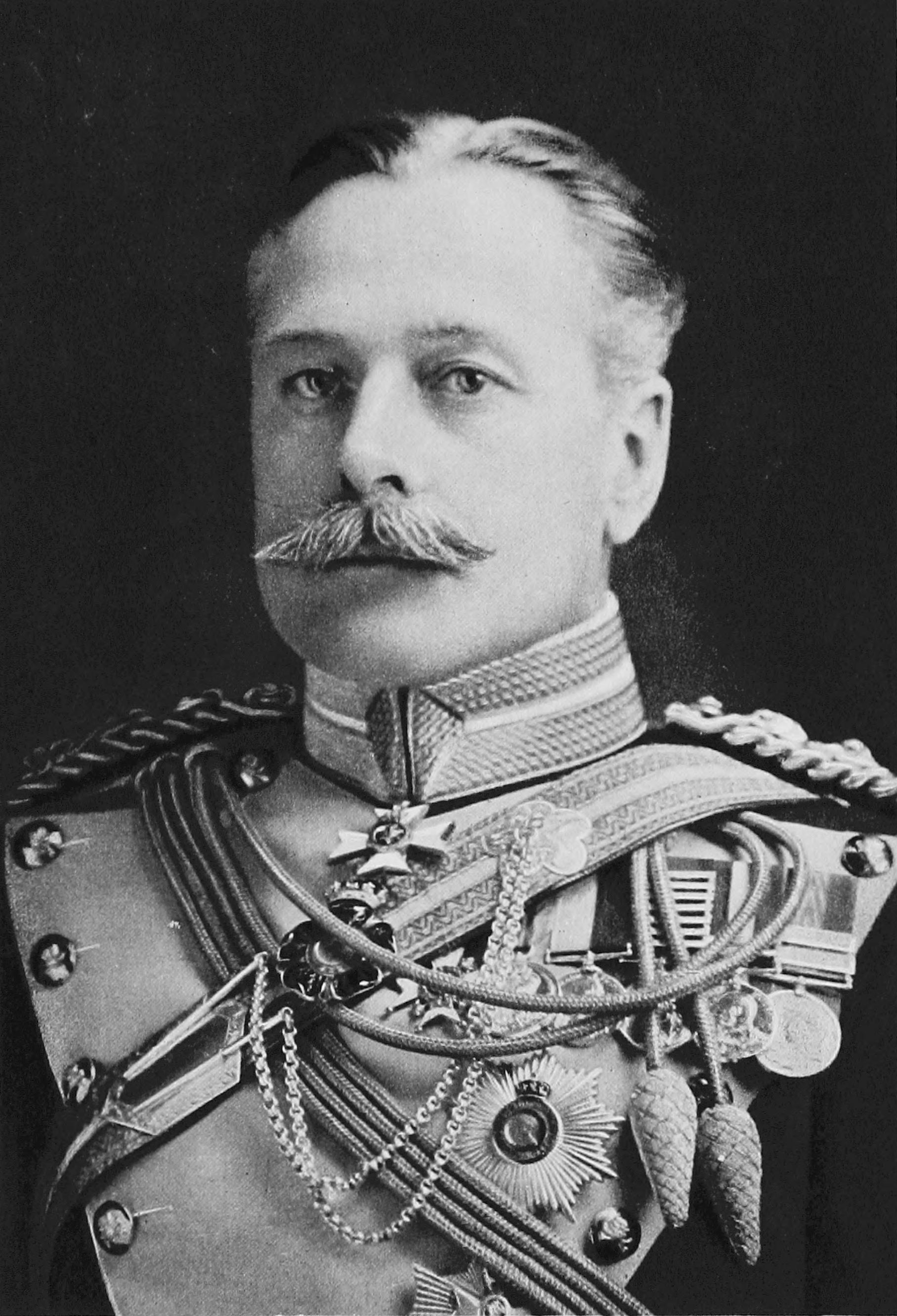
- Haig in 1917
- Born: 19 June 1861; Edinburgh, Scotland
- Died: 29 January 1928 (aged 66); London, England
- Burial place: Dryburgh Abbey, Scottish Borders
- Spouse: Dorothy Maud Vivian (m. 1905)
- Relatives: George Haig, 2nd Earl Haig (son); Irene Astor, Baroness Astor of Hever (daughter)
- Military career
- Allegiance: United Kingdom
- Branch: British Army
- Service years: 1884–1920
- Rank: Field Marshal
- Nickname: Butcher Haig
- Commands: British Expeditionary Force (1915–1919); First Army (1914–1915); I Corps (1914); Aldershot Command (1912–1914); Chief of the General Staff in India (1909–1912); 17th Lancers (1901–1903); 3rd Cavalry Brigade (1900)
- Conflicts: Mahdist War; Second Boer War; First World War
- Awards: Knight of the Order of the Thistle; Knight Grand Cross of the Order of the Bath; Member of the Order of Merit; Knight Grand Cross of the Royal Victorian Order; Knight Commander of the Order of the Indian Empire; Mentioned in Despatches; Complete list

Field Marshal Douglas Haig, 1st Earl Haig (/heɪɡ/; 19 June 1861 – 29 January 1928) was a senior officer of the British Army. During the First World War he commanded the British Expeditionary Force (BEF) on the Western Front from late 1915 until the end of the war.

Haig's military career included service in the War Office, where he was instrumental in the creation of the Territorial Force in 1908. In January 1917 he was promoted to the rank of field marshal, subsequently leading the BEF during the final Hundred Days Offensive. This campaign, in combination with the Kiel mutiny, the Wilhelmshaven mutiny, the proclamation of a republic on 9 November 1918 and revolution across Germany, led to the armistice of 11 November 1918. It is considered by some historians to be one of the greatest victories ever achieved by a British-led army.

Haig gained a favourable reputation during the immediate post-war years, with his funeral a day of national mourning. However he also had some prominent contemporary detractors and, beginning in the 1960s, has been widely criticised for his wartime leadership. He was nicknamed "Butcher Haig" for the two million British casualties under his command. The Canadian War Museum comments: "His epic but costly offensives at the Somme (1916) and Passchendaele (1917) have become nearly synonymous with the carnage and futility of First World War battles." Since the 1980s many historians have argued that the public hatred of Haig failed to recognise the adoption of new tactics and technologies by forces under his command, the important role played by British forces in the allied victory of 1918, and that high casualties were a consequence of the tactical and strategic realities of the time.

== Early life ==
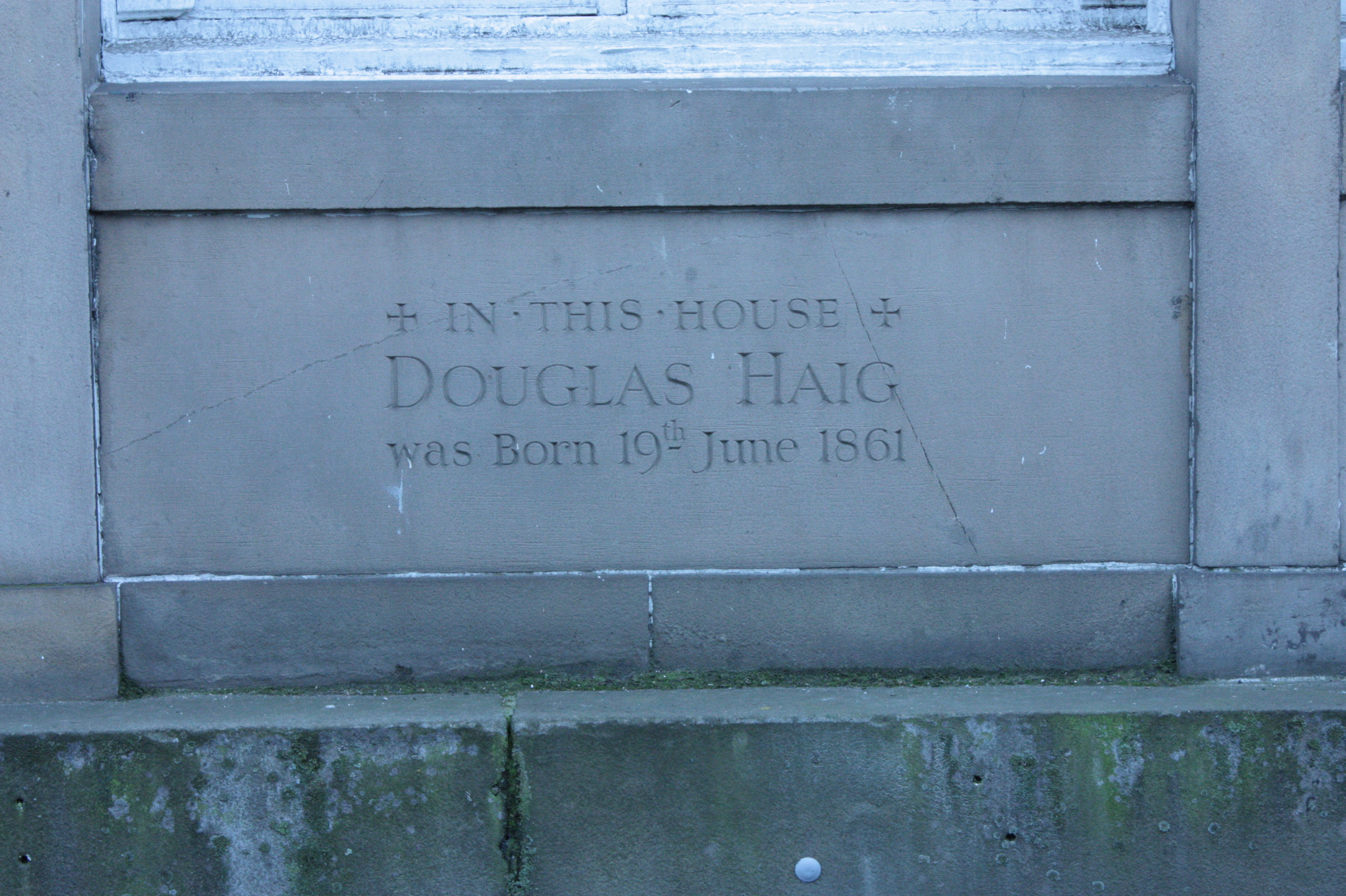
Plaque marking Earl Haig's birthplace, Charlotte Square, Edinburgh

Haig was born in a house on Charlotte Square, Edinburgh. His father, John Richard Haig, an alcoholic, was head of the family's successful Haig & Haig whisky distillery; he had an income of £10,000 per year (£1,647,200 in 2025), an enormous amount at the time. His mother, Rachel (daughter of Hugh Veitch of Stewartfield), was from an impoverished gentry family. The family home was Haig House in Windygates, Fife.

Haig's education began in 1869 as a boarder at Mr Bateson's School in St Andrews. Later in 1869, he switched to Edinburgh Collegiate School, and then in 1871 to Orwell House, a preparatory school in Warwickshire. He then attended Clifton College. Both of Haig's parents had died by the time he was eighteen.

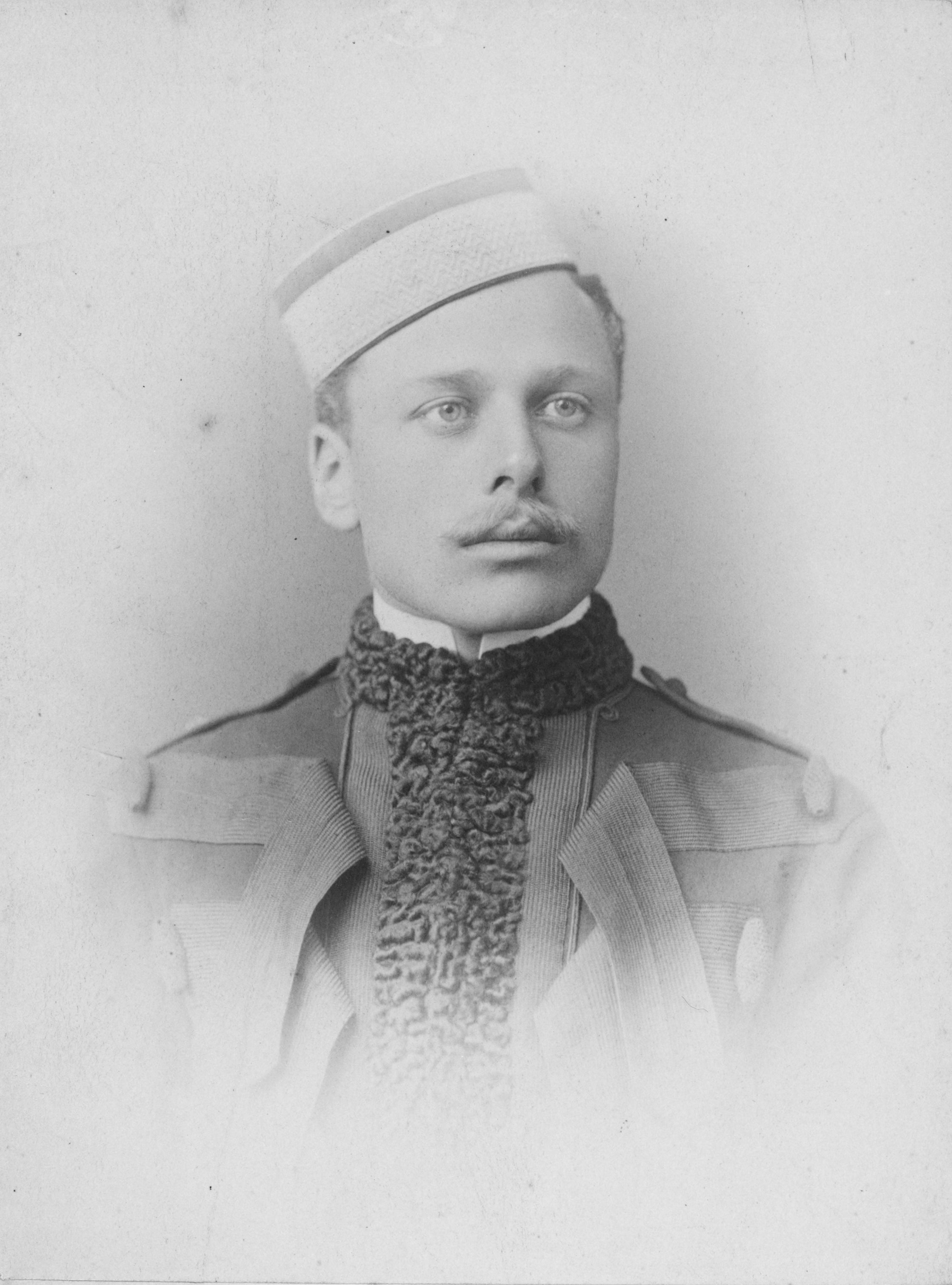
Age 23 in 1885, in his hussar's uniform

After a tour of the United States with his brother, Haig studied Political Economy, Ancient History and French Literature at Brasenose College, Oxford, 1880–1883. He devoted much of his time to socialising – he was a member of the Bullingdon Club – and equestrian sports. He was one of the best young horsemen at Oxford and part of the University polo team. While an undergraduate he was initiated as a Freemason in Elgin's Lodge at Leven, Fife, taking the first and second degrees of Freemasonry. In 1920 Archibald Montgomerie, 16th Earl of Eglinton encouraged Haig to complete his Masonic progression, and he returned to his lodge to take the third degree, serving as Worshipful Master of the lodge from 1925 to 1926. He became an officer of the Grand Lodge of Scotland.

Although he passed his final exam at Oxford (a requirement for university applicants to Sandhurst), he was not eligible for a degree as he had missed a term's residence owing to illness, and if he had stayed for longer he would have been above the age limit (23) to begin officer training at the Royal Military College, Sandhurst, which he entered in January 1884. Because he had been to university, Haig was considerably older than most of his class at Sandhurst. He was Senior Under-Officer, was awarded the Anson Sword and passed out first in the order of merit. He was commissioned as a lieutenant into the 7th (Queen's Own) Hussars on 7 February 1885.

== Career ==
=== Junior officer ===
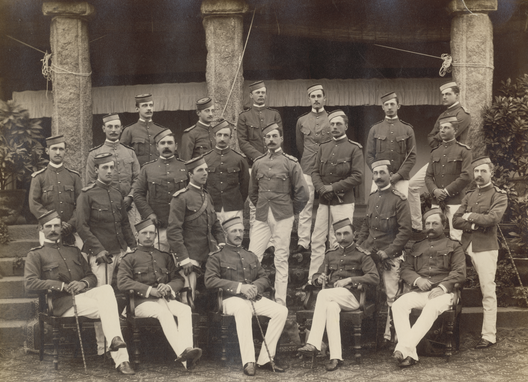
Officers of the 7th Hussars, Secunderabad, 1890. Lieutenant Haig is stood in the third row, with cane, second on the left.

Early in his military career, Haig played polo for England on a tour of the United States (August 1886). He would remain a polo enthusiast all his life, serving as Chairman of the Hurlingham Polo Association from 1914 until 1922, President of the Army Polo Committee, and founder of the Indian Polo Association.

Haig saw overseas service in India (sent out November 1886), where he was appointed the regiment's adjutant in 1888. He was something of a disciplinarian, but impressed his superiors by his administrative skill and analysis of training exercises. He was promoted to captain on 23 January 1891.

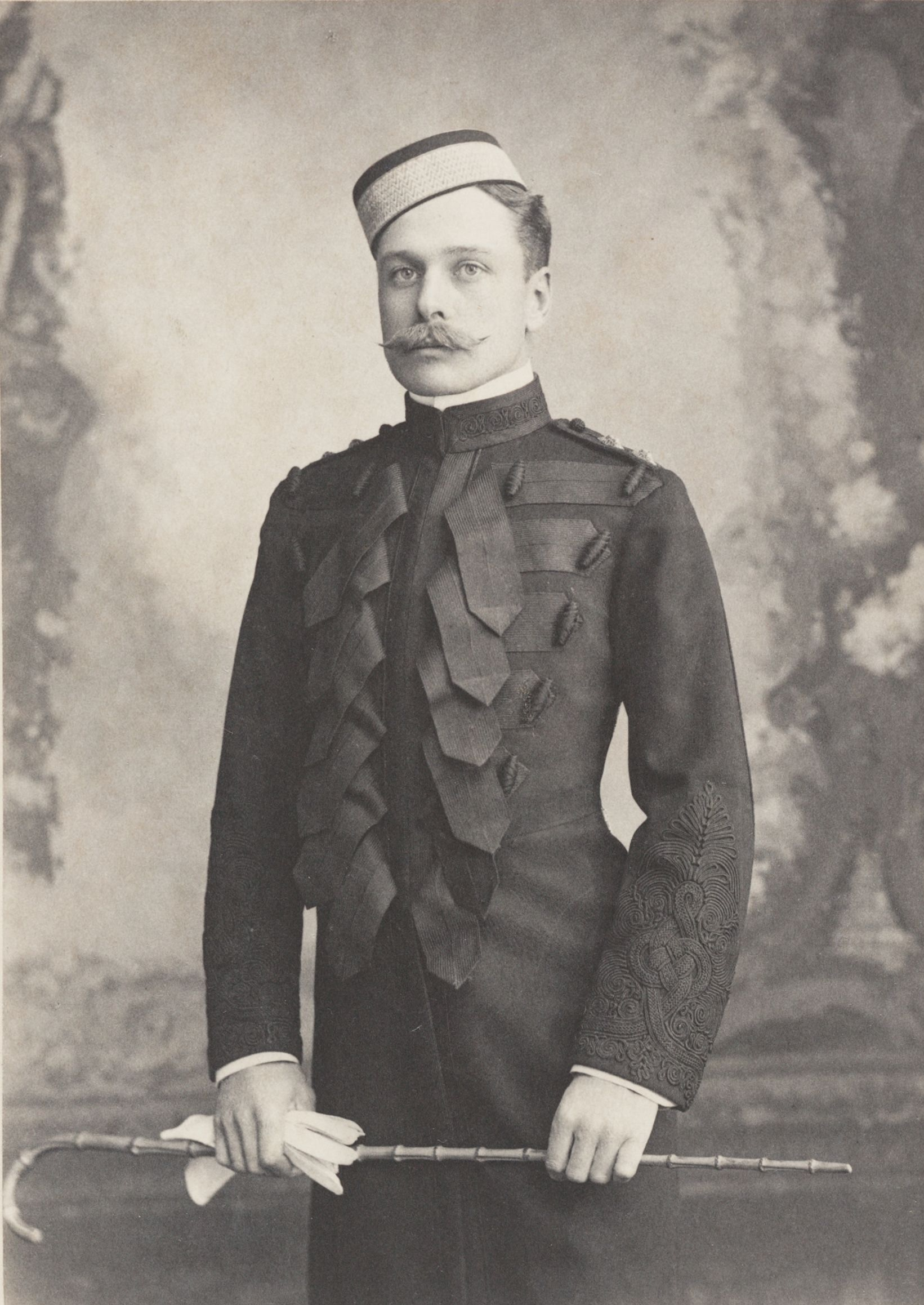
Photograph of the young Douglas Haig as an officer with the 7th Hussars.

Haig left India in November 1892 to prepare for the entrance exam for the Staff College, Camberley, which he sat in June 1893. Although he was placed in the top 28 (the number of places awarded by exam) he was not awarded a place as he had narrowly failed the compulsory mathematics paper. He concealed this failure for the rest of his life and in 1910 recommended dropping the mathematics paper as a requirement. Adjutant-General Sir Redvers Buller refused to award Haig one of the four nominated places, citing his colour blindness, despite Haig having his eyesight rechecked by a German oculist and despite glowing testimonials. It has been postulated that Buller was looking for a rationale to give a place to an infantry officer.

Haig returned briefly to India as second-in-command of the squadron which he had himself commanded in 1892, then returned to the UK as Aide-de-camp to Sir James Keith Fraser, Inspector General of Cavalry. Fraser was one of those who had lobbied for Haig to enter the Staff College, and he was finally nominated in late 1894, a common practice in the day for promising candidates. While waiting to take up his place, he travelled to Germany to report on cavalry manoeuvres there, and served as staff officer to Colonel John French on manoeuvres. The careers of French and Haig were to be entwined for the next twenty-five years, and Haig helped French write the cavalry drillbook, published 1896.

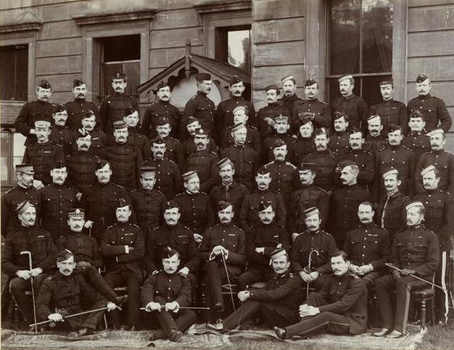
Officers, many of whom later became generals, at the Staff College, Camberley, 1897. Stood in the third row, fifth from the left, is Captain Haig, head tilted to the left.

Haig entered the Staff College, Camberley, from 1896 to 1897, gaining his psc, where he was apparently not popular with his peers. For example, they chose Captain Edmund Allenby as Master of the Drag Hunt, despite Haig being the better rider. Haig impressed the chief instructor, Lieutenant Colonel George Francis Robert Henderson, and completed the course, leaving in 1897. Camberley's old-fashioned curriculum especially influenced Haig, as he was an absorber of doctrine rather than an original thinker. Haig was taught that victory must come from defeating the main enemy army in battle, and that attrition (the "wearing out fight") was merely a prelude to the commitment of reserves for a decisive battlefield victory; traces of this thought can be seen at Loos and the Somme. Great emphasis was placed on morale and mobility, and on Joachim Murat's cavalry pursuit after Napoleon's Jena campaign of 1806.

=== Mahdist War, 1898 ===
In early January Haig was picked by Evelyn Wood (by then Adjutant-General) as one of three recent staff college graduates requested by Kitchener for a campaign in the Mahdist War in the Sudan. He may have been picked to keep an eye on Kitchener, as Wood invited him to write to him in confidence. Haig needed little encouragement to (privately) criticise his superiors – he was especially critical of Kitchener's dictatorial habits. Kitchener's force was Anglo-Egyptian, and Haig was required to formally join the Egyptian Army, most of whose officers were British. The plan had been for him to train and take command of an Egyptian cavalry squadron, but Kitchener did not want a command reshuffle with combat imminent. Unlike many British officers, Haig believed that the Egyptians could make good soldiers if properly trained and led. Still without a formal position but accompanying the cavalry, Haig saw his first action in a skirmish south of Atbara (21 March). In his report to Wood about the skirmish, Haig commented on the lack of British machine guns. While later criticized for his failure to optimize the use of machine guns, Haig made a special trip to the Royal Small Arms Factory at Enfield to study the Maxim Gun, and throughout the campaign commented on its worth.

Four days later he was made staff officer of Robert Broadwood's cavalry brigade. Haig distinguished himself at his second action, the Battle of Nukheila (6 April), where he supervised the redeployment of squadrons to protect the rear and then launch a flank attack. He was present at the Battle of Atbara (8 April), after which he criticised Kitchener for launching a frontal attack without taking the Dervishes in flank. During the latter action Haig risked his life rescuing a wounded Egyptian soldier under enemy fire, an act which moved several officers present to believe Haig should receive the Victoria Cross. After Atbara, Kitchener was given reinforcements and Haig received a squadron of his own, which he commanded at Omdurman (in reserve during the battle, then on a flank march into the town afterwards). He was promoted to brevet major on 15 November 1898.

=== Second Boer War, 1899–1902 ===
Haig returned to the United Kingdom hoping for a position at the War Office, but was instead appointed (May 1899) brigade major to the 1st Cavalry Brigade at Aldershot.

Haig had recently lent £2,500 (in a formal contract with interest, worth £400,000 in 2024) to the brigade commander, John French, to cover his losses from South African mining speculations. The loan allowed French to maintain his commission. Haig was promoted to the substantive rank of major on 26 June 1899.

Haig was soon appointed a deputy assistant adjutant general (September 1899) in Natal and then assistant adjutant general (i.e. chief staff officer) of French's brigade-sized force as it was sent to fight in the Second Boer War. He took part in French's first battle, Elandslaagte (21 October). French and Haig were ordered to leave Ladysmith as the four-month siege began, to take charge of the new Cavalry Division arriving from the UK. The two men escaped on the last train to leave Ladysmith (2 November 1899), lying down as it passed through enemy fire.

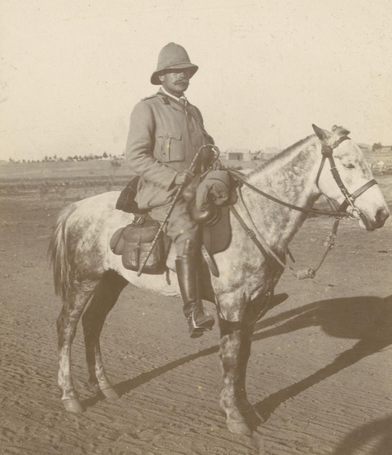
Major Douglas Haig seen mounted on a grey horse near Pretoria, in the Transvaal Republic on Friday, 8 June 1900.

Haig continued to be sceptical of the importance of artillery, basing his opinions on interviews with enemy prisoners. After French's Colesberg Operations to protect Cape Colony, Frederick Roberts, newly arrived as C-in-C, appointed his protégé Colonel Charles Hay, 20th Earl of Erroll, over French's protests, to the job of assistant adjutant general of the Cavalry Division, with Haig, who had been promised the job (and the local rank of lieutenant colonel), as his deputy. Cavalry played a leading role in this stage of the war, including the relief of Kimberley (15 February 1900), which featured a spectacular British cavalry charge at Klip Drift. Haig was briefly (21 February 1900) given command of the 3rd Cavalry Brigade, then made AAG to the Cavalry Division after Erroll was moved to a different job. French's division took part in the capture of Bloemfontein (13 March 1900) and Pretoria (5 June 1900). Haig privately criticised Roberts and thought him a "silly old man".

After Roberts had won the conventional war, Kitchener was left in charge of fighting the Boers, who had taken to guerrilla warfare. The Cavalry Division was disbanded (November 1900) and French, with Haig still his chief of staff, was put in charge of an all-arms force policing the Johannesburg area, later trying to capture the Boer leader Christiaan de Wet around Bloemfontein. In January 1901 Haig was given a column of 2,500 men with the local rank of brigadier general, patrolling Cape Colony, and chasing Commandant Pieter Hendrik Kritzinger. As was standard policy at that time, Haig's actions included burning farmsteads as part of the scorched earth policies ordered by Lord Kitchener as well as rounding up Boer women and children to be placed in concentration camps.

Throughout the war Haig's sister, Henrietta, had been lobbying Evelyn Wood for her brother to have command of a cavalry regiment when the war was over. French, probably not wanting to part with a valuable assistant, recommended Herbert Lawrence for the vacant command of the 17th Lancers, but Roberts, now Commander-in-Chief back in Britain, overruled him and gave it to Haig (May 1901). As the 17th Lancers were in South Africa at the time Haig was able to combine that command with that of his own column.

As the war drew to a close Haig had to locate and escort the Boer leader Jan Christiaan Smuts to the peace negotiations at Vereeninging. Haig was mentioned in despatches four times for his service in South Africa (including by Lord Roberts on 31 March 1900, and by Lord Kitchener on 23 June 1902), and appointed a Companion of the Order of the Bath (CB) in November 1900. He was promoted to the substantive rank of lieutenant colonel on 17 July 1901.

Following the war, Haig left Cape Town with 540 officers and men of the 17th Lancers on the SS German in late September 1902. The regiment was supposed to stay in South Africa but in the end returned home sooner than planned, and arrived at Southampton in late October, when they were posted to Edinburgh. Haig was appointed an aide-de-camp to King Edward VII in the October 1902 South Africa Honours list, with the brevet rank of colonel.

=== Inspector general of Cavalry, India ===
Haig continued as the commanding officer of the 17th Lancers until 1903, stationed in Edinburgh. In October he was then appointed inspector general of cavalry in British India, for which he was promoted to substantive colonel whilst holding the local rank of major general while in his new assignment. He would have preferred command of the cavalry brigade at Aldershot, where French was now the general officer commanding, but had first to spend a year on garrison duty at Edinburgh until the previous incumbent completed his term.

Haig's war service had earned him belated but rapid promotion: having been a captain until the relatively advanced age of thirty-seven, by May 1904, when he received his promotion, he had become the youngest major general in the British Army at that time. He was present at the Rawalpindi Parade 1905 to honour the Prince and Princess of Wales' visit to India. At this time a great deal of the energies of the most senior British generals were taken up with the question of whether cavalry should still be trained to charge with sword and lance (the view of French and Haig). Lord Roberts, now Commander-in-Chief of the Forces, warned Kitchener (now Commander-in-Chief, India) to be "very firm with Haig" on this issue, and wrote that Haig was a "clever, able fellow" who had great influence over Sir John French.

=== Marriage and children ===
On leave from India, Haig married Dorothy Maud Vivian on 11 July 1905 after a whirlwind courtship (she had spotted him for the first time when he was playing polo at Hurlingham two years earlier). She was a daughter of Hussey Vivian, 3rd Baron Vivian and Louisa Duff.

The couple had four children:

- Lady Alexandra Henrietta Louisa Haig (9 March 1907 – 1997); First married to Rear-Admiral Clarence Howard-Johnston, with whom she had three children: James Howard-Johnston, Xenia, and Peter. She secondly married in 1954 historian Hugh Trevor-Roper, who was later created Baron Dacre of Glanton.
- Lady Victoria Doris Rachel Haig (7 November 1908 – 1993). Married Colonel Claud Andrew Montagu Douglas Scott on 10 August 1929, with whom she had two children (divorced 1951)
- George Alexander Eugene Douglas Haig, 2nd Earl Haig (15 March 1918 – 10 July 2009)
- Lady Irene Violet Freesia Janet Augusta Haig (7 October 1919 – 2001); wife of Gavin Astor, 2nd Baron Astor of Hever

Haig had used his leave in 1905 to lobby for a job at the War Office, but the proposal was rejected by H. O. Arnold-Forster, the Secretary of State for War, as too blatantly relying on royal influence.

=== War Office ===
The Boer War had exposed Britain's lack of a general staff and modern reserve army. In August 1906 Haig was appointed Director of Military Training at the War Office. The Secretary of State, Richard Haldane, later wrote that Haig had "a first rate general staff mind" and "gave invaluable advice". Although both men later claimed that the reforms had been to prepare Britain for continental war, they created a small professional army within a budget, with conscription politically impossible.

The reforms reorganised the militia, yeomanry and volunteers into the new Territorial Force. Haig was intolerant of what he regarded as old-fashioned opinions and not good at negotiating with strangers. Haig had wanted a reserve of 900,000 men, but Haldane settled for a more realistic 300,000. Haig's skills at administration and organising training and inspections were better employed in setting up an Expeditionary Force of 120,000 men in 1907. As an intimate of Haldane Haig was able to ensure high priority for cavalry, less for artillery, contrary to the advice of Lord Roberts (now retired). Haig's records of his time supervising artillery exercises show little interest in technical matters.

In November 1907 Haig was moved sideways to Director of Staff Duties. He required commanders to take the staff officers assigned to them (rather than choose their own by patronage) and assigned staff officers to the new Territorial Army. He supervised publication of "Field Service Regulations", which was later very useful in expanding the BEF, although it still stressed the importance of cavalry charging with sword and lance. At this time he was completing a separate work, "Cavalry Studies", and devoting much time to cavalry exercises.

=== Chief of Staff, India ===
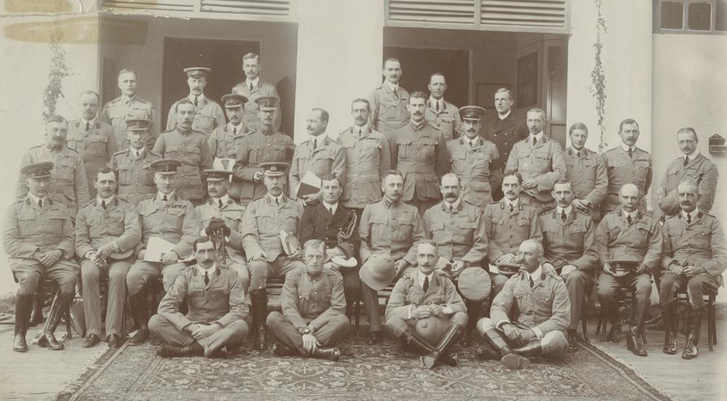
General Sir O'Moore Creagh, the C-in-C, India, and members of his staff, c. 1910. Major General Douglas Haig is sat in the second row, seventh from the left.

By 1909 it seemed likely that an Anglo-German War loomed and Haig was reluctant to accept appointment as Chief of the General Staff in India. He passed the Director of Staff Duties job to his loyal follower Brigadier-General Launcelot Kiggell, to whom he wrote with "advice" every fortnight. Haig, who had been knighted for his work at the War Office back in June, was promoted to lieutenant-general in November 1910. In India he had hoped to develop the Indian General Staff and to organise despatch of the British Indian Army to a future European war. The latter was vetoed by Viceroy Lord Hardinge. An Indian Corps would serve on the Western Front early in the conflict, and Indian troops were used in comparatively small formations in the Middle East.

=== Aldershot ===
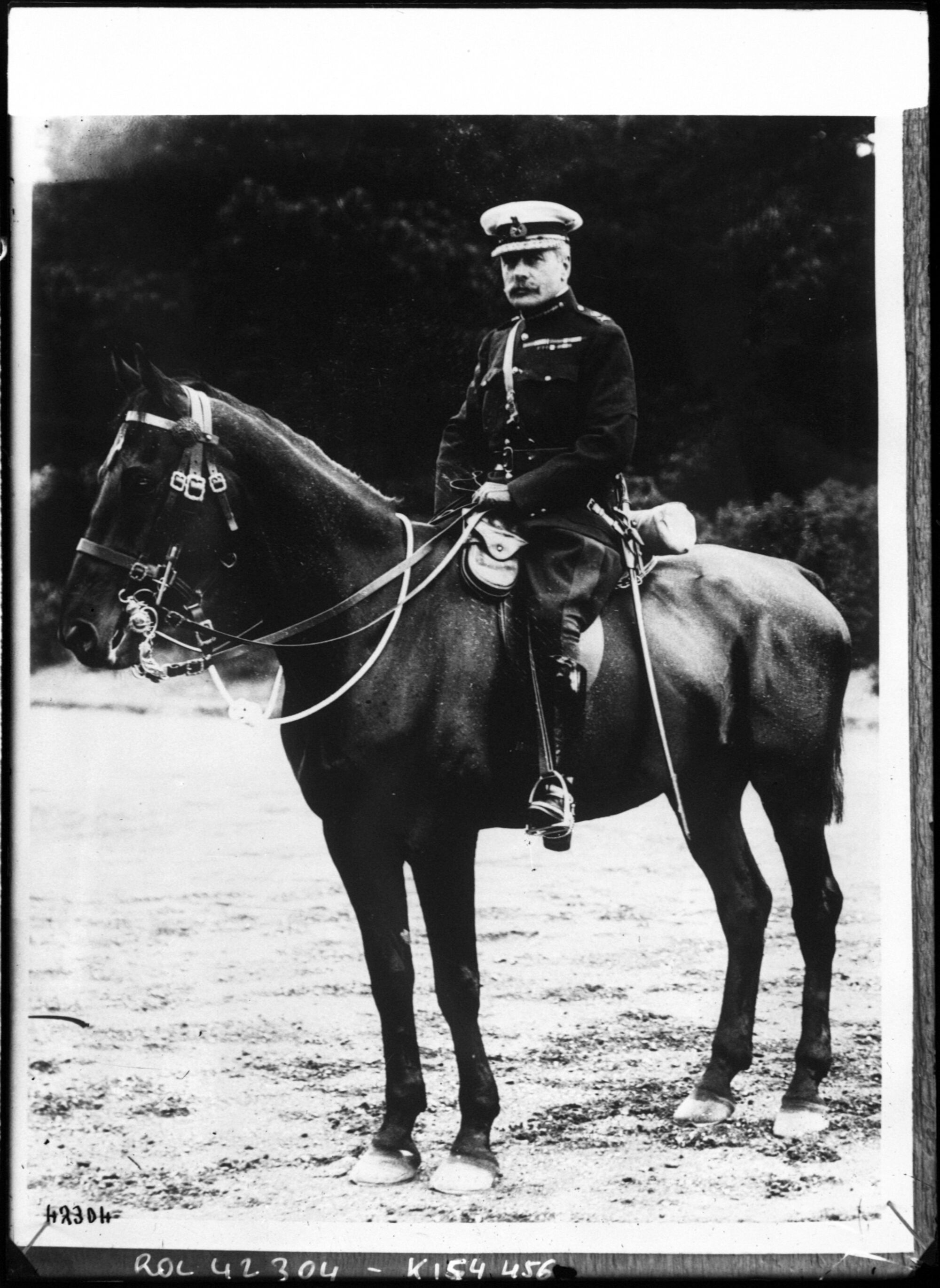
Haig on horseback in 1914.

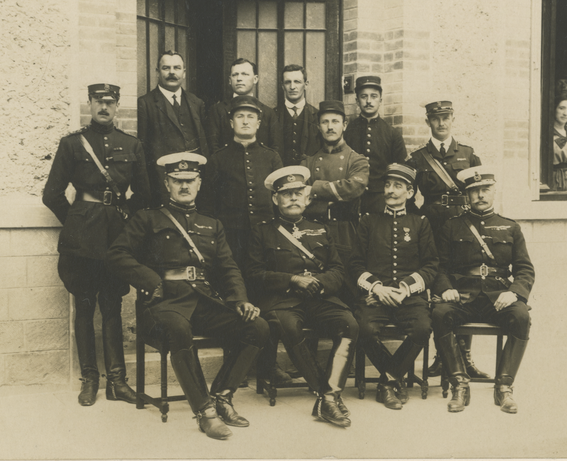
British and French officers at French manoeuvres, 1914. Lieutenant General Haig is sat in the front row on the extreme right.

Haig left India in December 1911, and took up an appointment as GOC Aldershot Command (which had the 1st and 2nd divisions and the 1st Cavalry Brigade under its command) in March 1912. In May he was appointed colonel of the 17th Lancers, in succession to Major General Thomas Cooke.

In the Army Manoeuvres of 1912 he was decisively beaten by Lieutenant General Sir James Grierson despite having the odds in his favour, because of Grierson's superior use of air reconnaissance. At dinner afterwards Haig abandoned his prepared text, and although he wrote that his remarks were "well received", John Charteris recorded that they were "unintelligible and unbearably dull" and that the visiting dignitaries fell asleep. Haig's poor public speaking skills aside, the manoeuvres were thought to have shown the reformed army efficient. In June 1913 he was appointed a Knight Commander of the Order of the Bath (KCB) in the 1913 Birthday Honours.

== First World War ==
=== 1914 ===
==== Outbreak of war ====
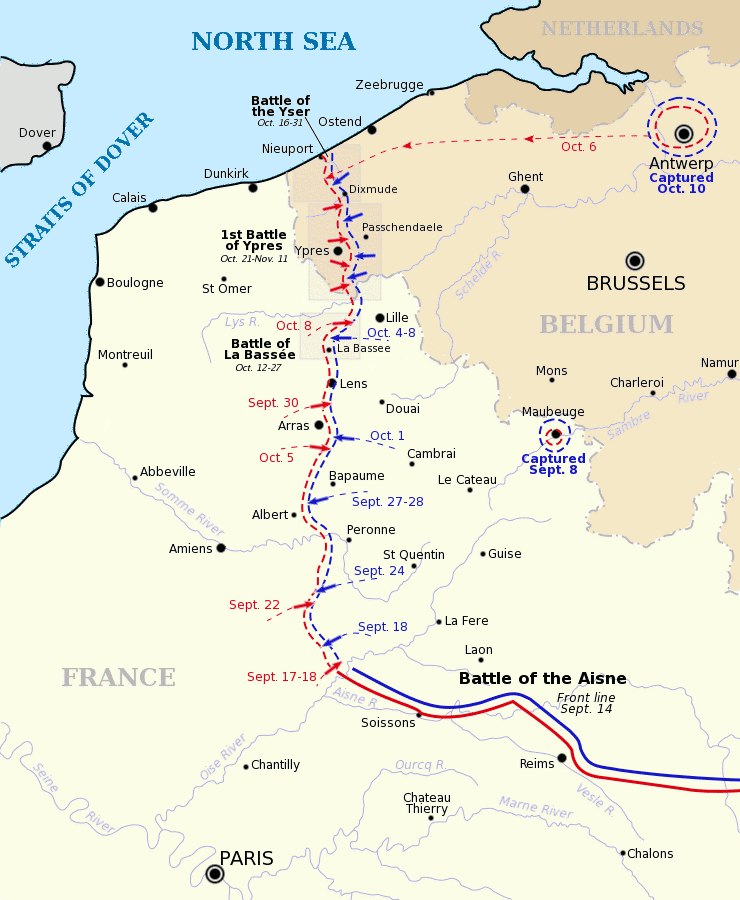
Map of the Western Front in 1914.

During the Curragh Mutiny (March 1914) Haig urged caution on his BGGS John Gough, whose brother Hubert Gough was threatening to resign rather than coerce Ulstermen into a semi-independent Ireland. Haig stressed that the army's duty was to keep the peace. Sir John French was forced to resign as Chief of the Imperial General Staff, after putting in writing a promise that officers would not be required to coerce Ulster; Haig respected Hubert Gough's principled stand but felt French had allowed himself to be used as a political tool by H. H. Asquith.

Upon the outbreak of war in August 1914, Haig helped organize the British Expeditionary Force (BEF), commanded by Field Marshal Sir John French. As planned, Haig's Aldershot command was formed into I Corps. In a letter to Haldane (4 August), Haig predicted that the war would last for months if not years; Haig wanted Haldane to delay sending the BEF to France until the Territorial Army had been mobilised and incorporated. Haig attended the War Council (5 August), at which it was decided that it was too dangerous to mobilise forward in France at Maubeuge near the Belgian border, as British mobilisation was running three days behind that of France and Germany. There were no other contingency plans – Haig and Kitchener proposed that the BEF would be better positioned to counter-attack in Amiens. Sir John French suggested landing at Antwerp, which was vetoed by Winston Churchill as the Royal Navy could not guarantee safe passage. A critical biographer writes that Haig was "more clear-sighted than many of his colleagues".

In his much-criticised memoirs 1914, French claimed that Haig had wanted to postpone sending the BEF, which may be partly true given what Haig had written to Haldane. Haig was so angry at this claim that he asked Cabinet Secretary Maurice Hankey to correct French's "inaccuracies". However Haig also rewrote his diary from this period, possibly to show himself in a better light and French in a poor one. The original manuscript diary does not survive but there is no positive evidence that it was destroyed, and it is just as likely that the extant typed version was prepared from dictation or notes now lost. Hankey's notes of the meeting record that Haig suggested delaying or sending smaller forces, but was willing to send forces if France was in danger of defeat or if France wanted them (which it did). Haig predicted that the war would last several years and that an army of a million men, trained by officers and NCOs withdrawn from the BEF, would be needed.

Haig had been appointed aide-de-camp to King George V in February 1914. During a royal inspection of Aldershot (11 August), Haig told the King that he had "grave doubts" about French's temper and military knowledge. He later claimed that these doubts had gone back to the Boer War but there appears to have been an element of later embellishment about this; Haig had in fact praised French during the Boer War and had welcomed his appointment as CIGS in 1911.

==== Mons to the Marne ====
Haig (left) with Major-General Charles Monro (GOC 2nd Division), Brigadier-General John Gough (Haig's BGGS), and Brigadier-General E. M. Perceval (commanding the 2nd Division's artillery) in a street in France, 1914.

Haig crossed over to Le Havre. The BEF landed in France on 14 August and advanced into Belgium. Haig was irritated by Sir John French, who ignored intelligence reports of German forces streaming westwards from Brussels, threatening an encirclement from the British left. Although II Corps fought off the German attack at Mons on 23 August the BEF was forced to withdraw.

The retreats of I and II Corps had to be conducted separately because of the Mormal Forest. The two corps were supposed to meet at Le Cateau but I Corps under Haig were stopped at Landrecies, leaving a large gap between the two. Haig's reactions to his corps' skirmish with German forces at Landrecies (during which Haig led his staff into the street, revolvers drawn, promising to "sell our lives dearly") caused him to send an exaggerated report to French, which caused French to panic. The following day 26 August, General Horace Smith-Dorrien's II Corps engaged the enemy in the Battle of Le Cateau, which was unsupported by Haig. This battle slowed the German advance. However, a critical biographer writes that too much has been made of the "moment of panic" at Landrecies, and that the 200-mile (320 km) retreat, over a period of 13 days, is a tribute to the "steady and competent leadership" of Haig and Smith-Dorrien.

On 25 August the French commander Joseph Joffre ordered his forces to retreat to the Marne, which compelled the BEF to further withdraw. Haig was irritated by the high-handed behaviour of the French, seizing roads which they had promised for British use and refusing to promise to cover the British right flank. He complained privately of French unreliability and lack of fighting competence, a complaint which he would keep up for the next four years. He wrote to his wife that he wished the British were operating independently from Antwerp, a proposal which he had rejected as "reckless" when Sir John French had made it at the War Council on 4 August.

The retreat caused Sir John French to question the competence of his Allies and led to his decision to withdraw the BEF south of the Seine. On 1 September, Lord Kitchener intervened by visiting French and ordering him to re-enter the battle and coordinate with Joffre's forces. The battle to defend Paris began on 5 September and became known as the first Battle of the Marne. Haig had wanted to rest his corps but was happy to resume the offensive when ordered. He drove on his subordinates when he thought them lacking in "fighting spirit". Although Sir John French praised Haig's leadership of his corps, Haig was privately contemptuous of French's overconfidence prior to Mons and excessive caution thereafter.

==== First Battle of Ypres ====
On 15 October, after two weeks of friction between British and French generals, Haig's I Corps was moved to Ypres in Flanders as part of the "Race to the Sea". In the belief that the German northern flank was weak, Haig was ordered to march on Ghent, Bruges and Courtrai in western Belgium but the new German Chief of Staff Erich von Falkenhayn was trying to do the opposite and roll up the Allied northern flank. I Corps marched headlong into a thrust westward by fresh German forces, resulting in the First Battle of Ypres. German forces, equipped with 250 heavy guns (a large number for this stage in the war), outnumbered I Corps by two to one and came close to success. At one point Haig mounted his horse to encourage his men, who were retreating around Gheluvelt, although the town had just been recaptured by a battalion of the Worcesters. Haig cemented his reputation at this battle and Ypres remained a symbolic location in later years. Haig was also influenced by the fact that the Germans had called off their offensive when they were on the verge of success, concluding that attacks needed to be kept up so long as there was any chance of success.

After a fortnight of intense fighting I Corps had been reduced from 18,000 men to just under 3,000 effectives by 12 November. After six days of bickering between British and French generals, I Corps was relieved by French troops; Haig was very suspicious of the pro-French sympathies of Sub Chief of Staff Henry Wilson. French, who had been ordered by his doctor to relieve the strain on his heart, recommended Haig for immediate promotion to general. Haig travelled to London on French's behalf to consult Kitchener about the plan to expand the BEF and reorganise it into two armies.

At this point it was thought that the war would end once the Germans were defeated by the Russians at Łódź and the difficulties of attacking on the Western Front were not yet appreciated. A failed attack by Smith-Dorrien's II Corps on Messines–Wytschaete (14–15 December) was blamed on poor GHQ staff work, and on 18 December, Haig met French, who said he wanted to sack the BEF chief of staff Archibald Murray, whose performance had been unsatisfactory throughout the campaign and promote his deputy Henry Wilson. Haig thought that Wilson had "no military knowledge" and recommended Quarter-Master General "Wully" Robertson. This was also the view of Lord Kitchener, so Robertson received the promotion. Haig received promotion to general on 16 November 1914.

=== 1915 ===
==== Spring offensives ====
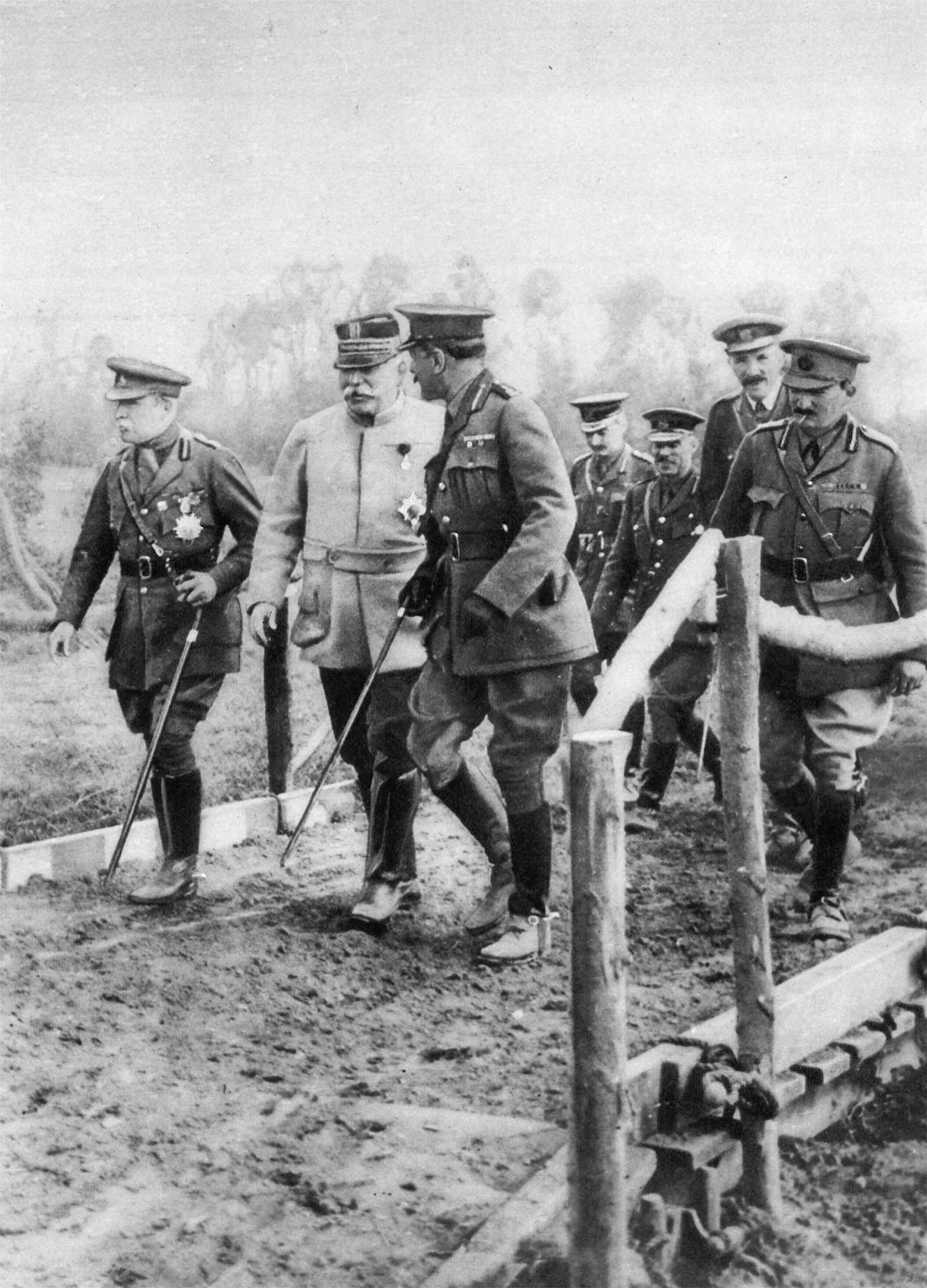
French, Joffre and Haig (left to right) visit the front line during 1915. Henry Wilson is second from the right, with Hubert Gough to his left.

Like French, Haig wanted to push along the North Sea Coast to Ostend and Zeebrugge but Joffre did not want the British acting so independently. Germany had recently sent eight infantry divisions to the Eastern Front, so French and Joffre agreed that a French offensive in Artois and Champagne, should be accompanied by a British offensive at Neuve-Chapelle to be conducted by Haig. At Neuve Chapelle, Haig wanted a quick bombardment and his subordinate Henry Rawlinson a longer and more methodical one. Shortage of shells meant that only a thirty-five-minute bombardment was possible but the small front of the attack gave it the concentration to succeed.

Haig was greatly interested in the potential of aircraft and met Major Hugh Trenchard of the Royal Flying Corps to organise photographic air reconnaissance and a map of German lines was obtained; aircraft were also used for artillery spotting. Four divisions attacked at the Battle of Neuve Chapelle on 10 March and penetrated 1,600 yards (1,500 m) but no progress was made on subsequent days, as the Germans brought in reinforcements. Casualties were around 12,000 on each side. Rawlinson had wanted to end the offensive after the first day and Haig felt that reserves should have been committed quicker. On Rawlinson's suggestion Haig came close to sacking Major-General Joey Davies until it was found that Davies had followed Rawlinson's orders; Haig reprimanded Rawlinson but thought him too valuable to sack. This may have made Rawlinson reluctant to stand up to Haig thereafter.

Whilst the Germans attacked Smith-Dorrien at the Second Battle of Ypres (April), new Allied offensives were planned by the French at Vimy and by Haig at Aubers Ridge (9 May). It was believed on the British side that the lessons of Neuve Chapelle had been learned – reserves were ready to exploit and mortars were ready to support attackers who had advanced beyond artillery cover – and that this time success would be complete not partial. The attack was less successful than Neuve Chapelle as the bombardment was over a wider front and against stronger defences; Haig was still focussed on winning a decisive victory by capturing key ground, rather than amassing firepower to inflict maximum damage. Attacks (at Festubert, 15–25 May) as a diversion, gained 1,100 yards (1,000 m) over a front of 4,400 yards (4,000 m), with 16,000 British casualties to around 6,600 German losses. Sir John French was satisfied that the attacks had taken pressure off the French at their request but Haig felt that German reserves were being exhausted, bringing victory nearer.

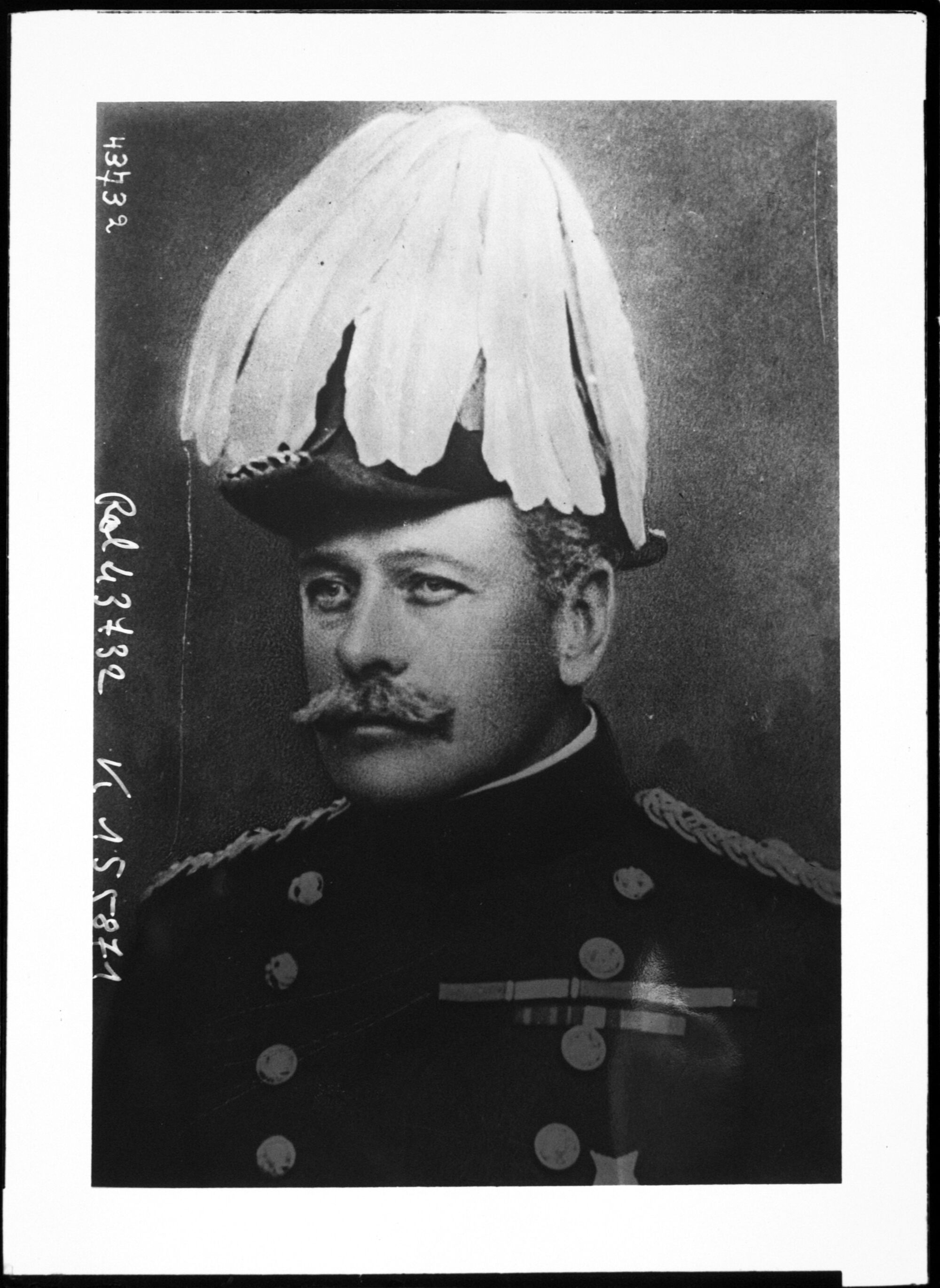
Haig as commander of the First Army.

Lack of shells at these offensives was, along with First Sea Lord John Fisher's resignation over the failed Dardanelles Campaign, a cause of the fall of the Liberal Government (19 May). Haig did not approve of the Northcliffe press attacks on Kitchener, whom he thought a powerful military voice against the folly of civilians like Churchill (despite the fact that Kitchener was an opponent of the strong General Staff which Haig wanted to see). French had been leaking information about the shell shortage to Charles à Court Repington of The Times, whom Haig detested and which he likened to "carrying on with a whore". French also communicated with Conservative leaders and to David Lloyd George who became Minister of Munitions in the new coalition government.

Haig was asked by Clive Wigram (one of the King's press staff) to smooth relations between French and Kitchener. At Robertson's suggestion, Haig received Kitchener at his HQ (despite French's attempt to block the meeting), where they shared their concerns about French. The two men met again in London (14 July), whilst Haig was receiving his Knight Grand Cross of the Order of the Bath (awarded on French's recommendation after Neuve Chapelle) from the King, who also complained to him about French. Over lunch with the King and Kitchener, Haig remarked that the best time to sack French would have been after the retreat to the Marne; it was agreed that the men would correspond in confidence.

Haig had long thought French petty, jealous, unbalanced, overly quick to meddle in party politics and easily manipulated by Henry Wilson. Haig was increasingly irritated by French's changes of orders and mercurial changes of mood as to the length of the war, which French now expected to last into 1916. Haig still thought Germany might collapse by November, although at the same time he was sending a memo to the War Office recommending that the BEF, now numbering 25 divisions, be equipped with the maximum number of heavy guns, ready for a huge decisive battle, 36 divisions strong in 1916.

==== Loos ====
The war was not going well – besides the failure at Cape Helles (landing 25 April), Bulgaria had joined the Central Powers (Serbia was soon overrun). Allied attacks in the west were needed to take pressure off the Russians, who were being flung out of Poland. The original plan was to attack in July. At Joffre's insistence the offensive was planned next to the French 10th Army at Loos.

Haig inspected the Loos area (24 June) and expressed dissatisfaction with the ground. French and Haig would have preferred to renew the attack at Aubers Ridge. French was dissuaded by Ferdinand Foch, who felt that only a British attack at Loos would pull in enough German reserves to allow the French to take Vimy Ridge. French wrote to Joffre saying he was willing to go along with these plans for the sake of Anglo-French cooperation, but then wrote to Joffre again suggesting an artillery bombardment with only limited British infantry attacks. Kitchener listened sympathetically to Joffre's suggestion that in future Joffre should set the size, dates and objectives of British offensives, although he only agreed for the Loos attack for the moment. It is unclear exactly why Kitchener and then Haig agreed to go along with Joffre's wishes – possibly the disastrous plight of the Russians, but it may be that a promise that poison gas could be used may have persuaded Haig. The French then postponed the attack as they picked new attacking ground in Champagne and arranged for extra shelling at Vimy, in both cases because of the very reasons – German-held villages and other obstructions – to which the British generals had objected.

Only 850 guns were available, too few for concentrated bombardment over a frontage far wider than at Neuve Chapelle. There was also argument over the placement of the reserve (including inexperienced New Army divisions), which Haig wanted close to the front. Haig had persuaded himself that decisive victory was possible, and it may be that French wanted to keep control of the reserve to stop them being thrown into battle needlessly. French tried in vain to forbid Haig to discuss his plans with Kitchener (on the grounds that Kitchener might leak them to politicians). Battle began (25 September) after Haig ordered the release of chlorine gas.

The attack failed in the north against the Hohenzollern Redoubt but broke through the German first line in the centre. The reserves were tired after night marches to reach the front in secrecy and were not available until 2 pm, but were thrown into battle without success on the second day.

==== Haig replaces French ====
Haig wrote a detailed letter to Kitchener claiming "complete" success on the first day and complaining that the reserves had not been placed as close to the front as agreed and that French had not released control of them when requested. Haig strengthened his case by reports that captured enemy officers had been astonished at the British failure to exploit the attack and by complaining about the government's foot-dragging at introducing conscription and the commitment of troops to sideshows like Salonika and Suvla Bay.

The failure of Loos was debated in the British press. Kitchener demanded a report and Lord Haldane was sent to France to interview French and Haig. French in turn demanded a report from Haig, in particular his claim to have penetrated the German lines. Lord Stamfordham, the King's Secretary, telephoned Robertson to ask his opinion of French and Robertson conferred with Haig – who was pushing for Robertson to be appointed Chief of the Imperial General Staff – before giving his opinion. The King also discussed the matter with Haig over dinner on a visit to the front (24 October). Haig again told him that French should have been sacked in August 1914. Four days later the King, whilst inspecting troops, was injured when thrown by one of Haig's horses and had to be evacuated to England on a stretcher, which embarrassed Haig. French had his orders releasing the reserves published in The Times (2 November), with an article by Repington blaming Haig. Haig demanded a correction of French's "inaccuracies", whereupon French ordered Haig to cease all correspondence on this matter,. Haig met with the Prime Minister, H. H. Asquith on 23 November and Bonar Law (Conservative Leader) the next day. Rumours were rife that French was to be sacked. Matters had been delayed as Kitchener was away on an inspection tour of the Mediterranean and French was sick in bed. Kitchener returned to London (3 Dec) and at a meeting with Haig that day, told him that he was to recommend to Asquith that Haig replace French.

Haig's appointment as Commander-in-Chief BEF was announced on 10 December and almost simultaneously Robertson became Chief of the Imperial General Staff in London. Haig and Robertson hoped that this would be the start of a new and more professional management of the war. Charles Monro was promoted to GOC First Army in Haig's place, not Rawlinson whom Haig would have preferred, and for reasons of seniority Haig was forced to accept the weak-willed Launcelot Kiggell, not Richard Butler as chief of staff BEF in succession to Robertson. Haig and French, who seemed ill, had a final handover meeting (18 December, the day before the formal change of command), at which Haig agreed that Churchill – recently resigned from the Cabinet and vetoed from command of a brigade – should be given command of a battalion.

=== 1916 ===
==== Prelude to the Somme ====
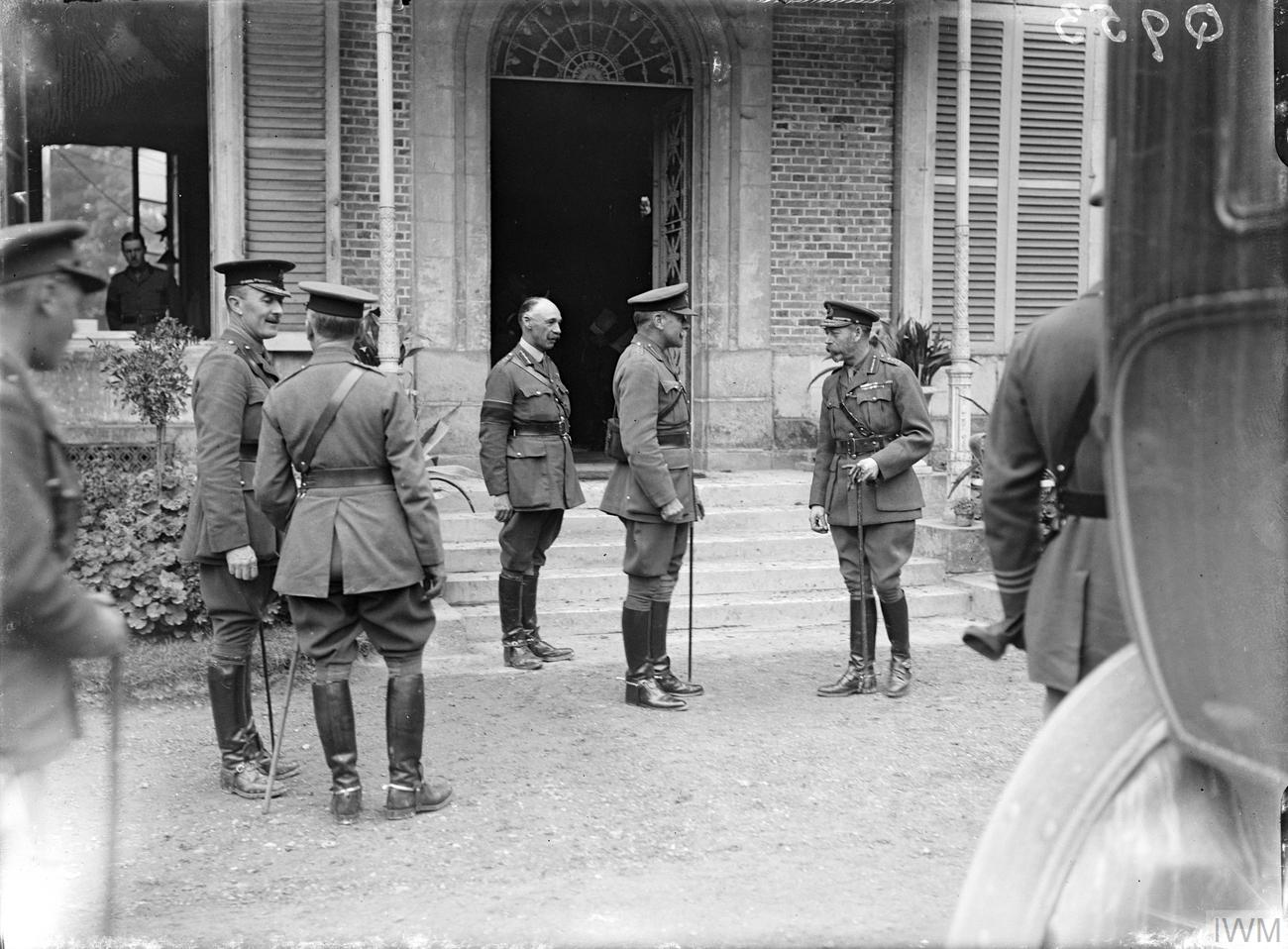
Haig (centre), King George V and General Rawlinson, GOC Fourth Army, at Querrieu, 1916.

For the first time (2 January) Haig attended church service with George Duncan, who was to have great influence over him. Haig saw himself as God's servant and was keen to have clergymen sent out whose sermons would remind the men that the war dead were martyrs in a just cause.

Robertson and Kitchener wanted to concentrate all efforts on the Western Front, unlike many in the Cabinet who preferred to focus on Salonika or Mesopotamia. Haig and Robertson were aware that Britain would have to take on more of the offensive burden, as France was beginning to run out of men, but thought that the Germans might retreat in the west so they could concentrate on beating the Russians. Haig thought that the Germans had already had plenty of "wearing out", that a decisive victory was possible in 1916, and urged Robertson to recruit more cavalry. Haig's preference was to regain control of the Belgian coast by attacking in Flanders, to bring the coast and the naval bases at Bruges, Zeebrugge and Ostend into Allied hands and where the Germans would suffer great loss if they were reluctant to retreat.

Lloyd George visited Haig at GHQ and afterwards wrote to Haig, to say that he had been impressed by his "grip" and by the "trained thought of a great soldier". Subsequent relations between the two men were not to be so cordial. Haig thought Lloyd George "shifty and unreliable". Haig had thought that the German troops reported near Verdun were a feint prior to an attack on the British but the Verdun Offensive began on 21 February. In March 1916 GHQ was moved from Saint-Omer to Montreuil, Pas-de-Calais. For his residence Haig commandeered Beaurepaire House a few kilometres away.

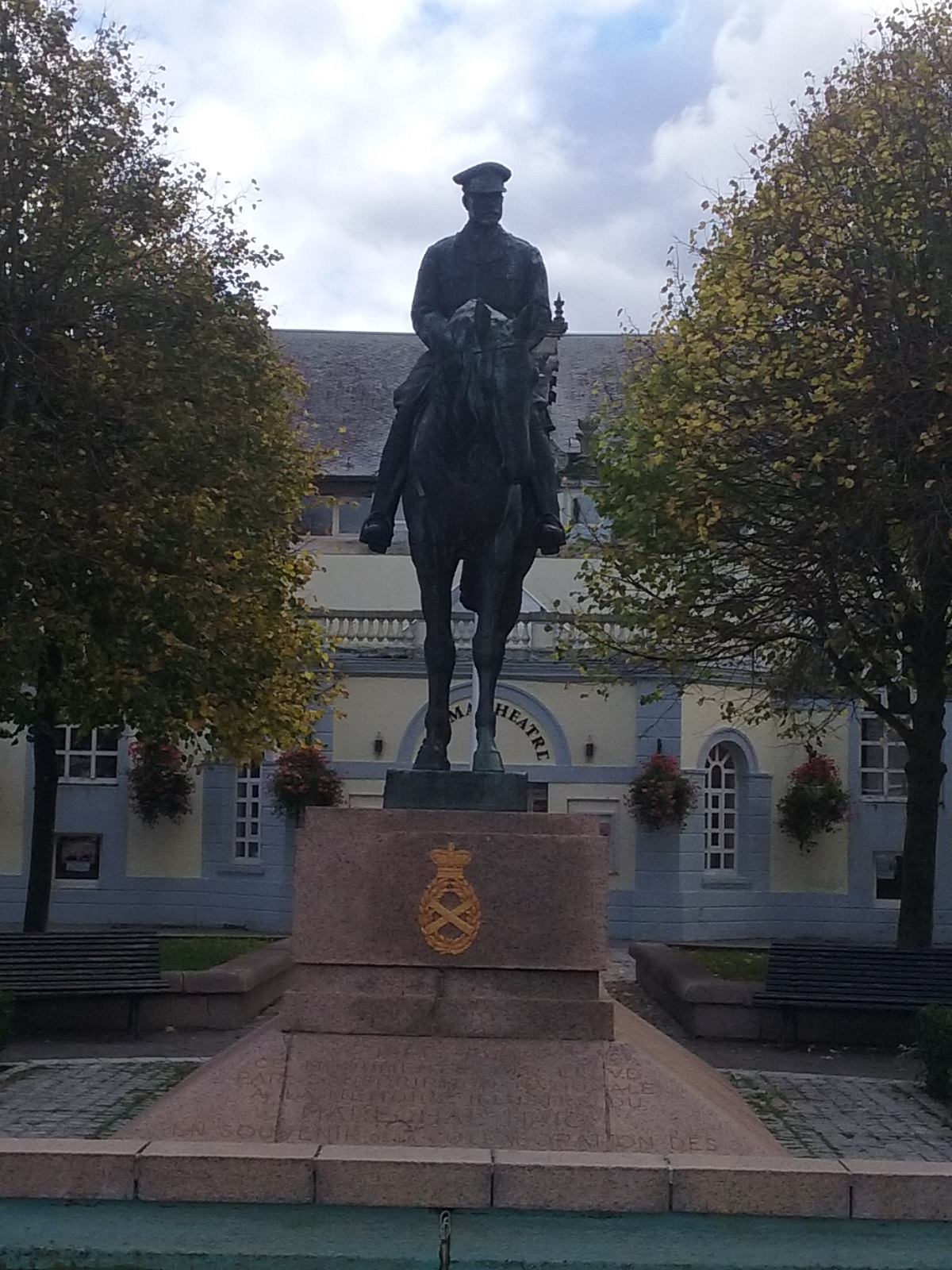
The statue of Field Marshal Haig, standing outside the theatre in Montreuil-sur-Mer.

Haig decided that Verdun had "worn down" the Germans enough and that a decisive victory was possible at once. The Cabinet were less optimistic; Kitchener would have preferred smaller, purely attritional attacks but sided with Robertson in telling the Cabinet that the Somme offensive should go ahead. Haig attended a Cabinet meeting in London (15 April) where the politicians were more concerned with the political crisis over the introduction of conscription.

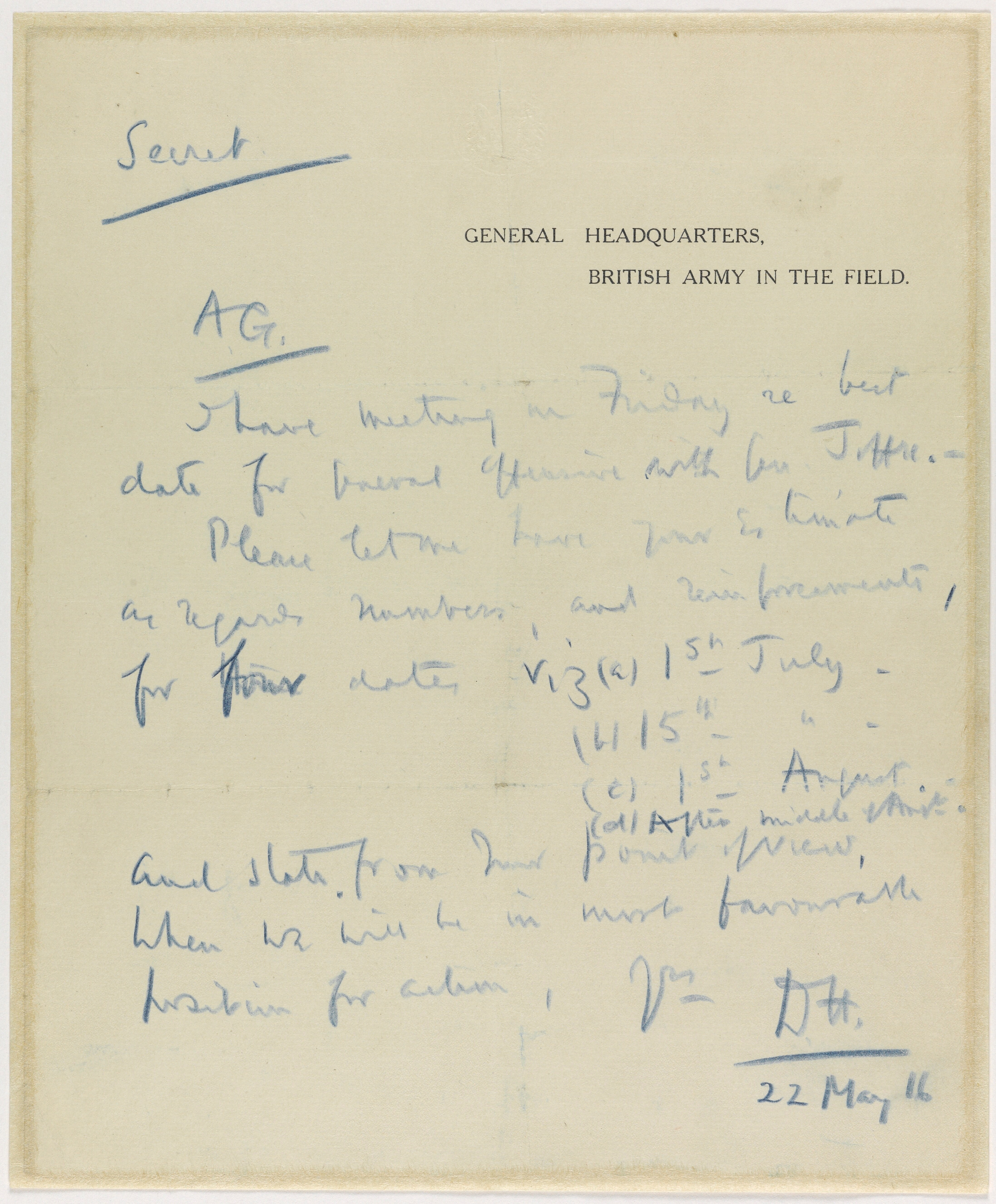
Memorandum from Haig to the army's adjutant general, Lieutenant General Sir Nevil Macready, asking his opinion on possible dates for launching the Somme offensive, 22 May 1916

The British refused to agree to French demands for a joint Anglo-French offensive from the Salonika bridgehead. Eventually, perhaps influenced by reports of French troop disturbances at Verdun, Haig agreed to attack on 29 June (later put back until 1 July). It later turned out that Philippe Pétain at Verdun was warning the French government that the "game was up" unless the British attacked.

The government was concerned at the volume of shipping space being used for fodder and wanted to cut the number of cavalry divisions. Haig opposed this, believing that cavalry would still be needed to exploit the imminent victory. Most of the fodder was for the horses, donkeys and mules which the BEF used to move supplies and heavy equipment. Discussing this matter with the King, Haig told him that Germany would collapse by the end of 1916. This round of planning ended with a sharp exchange of letters with the Cabinet, Haig rebuked them for interfering in military matters and declared that "I am responsible for the efficiency of the Armies in France". Lloyd George thought Haig's letter "perfectly insolent" and that the government "had the right to investigate any matter connected with the war that they pleased".

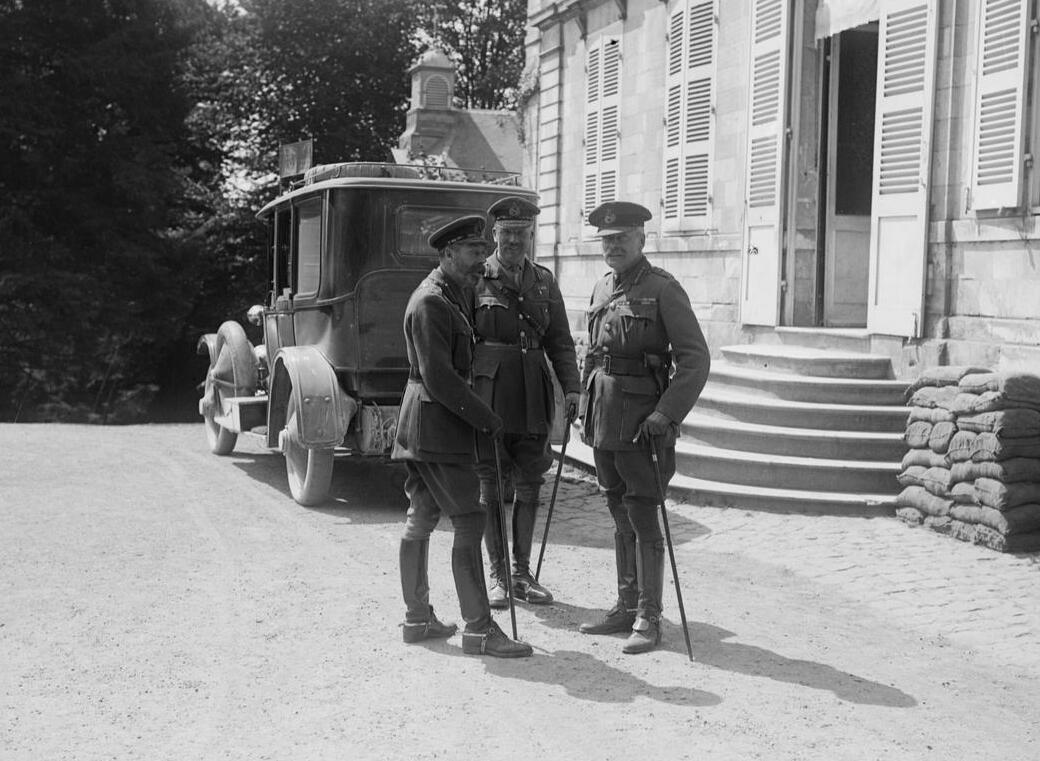
King George V with General Sir Douglas Haig and Major General Geoffrey Feilding, commanding the Guards Division, at Beauquesne, France, 12 August 1916.

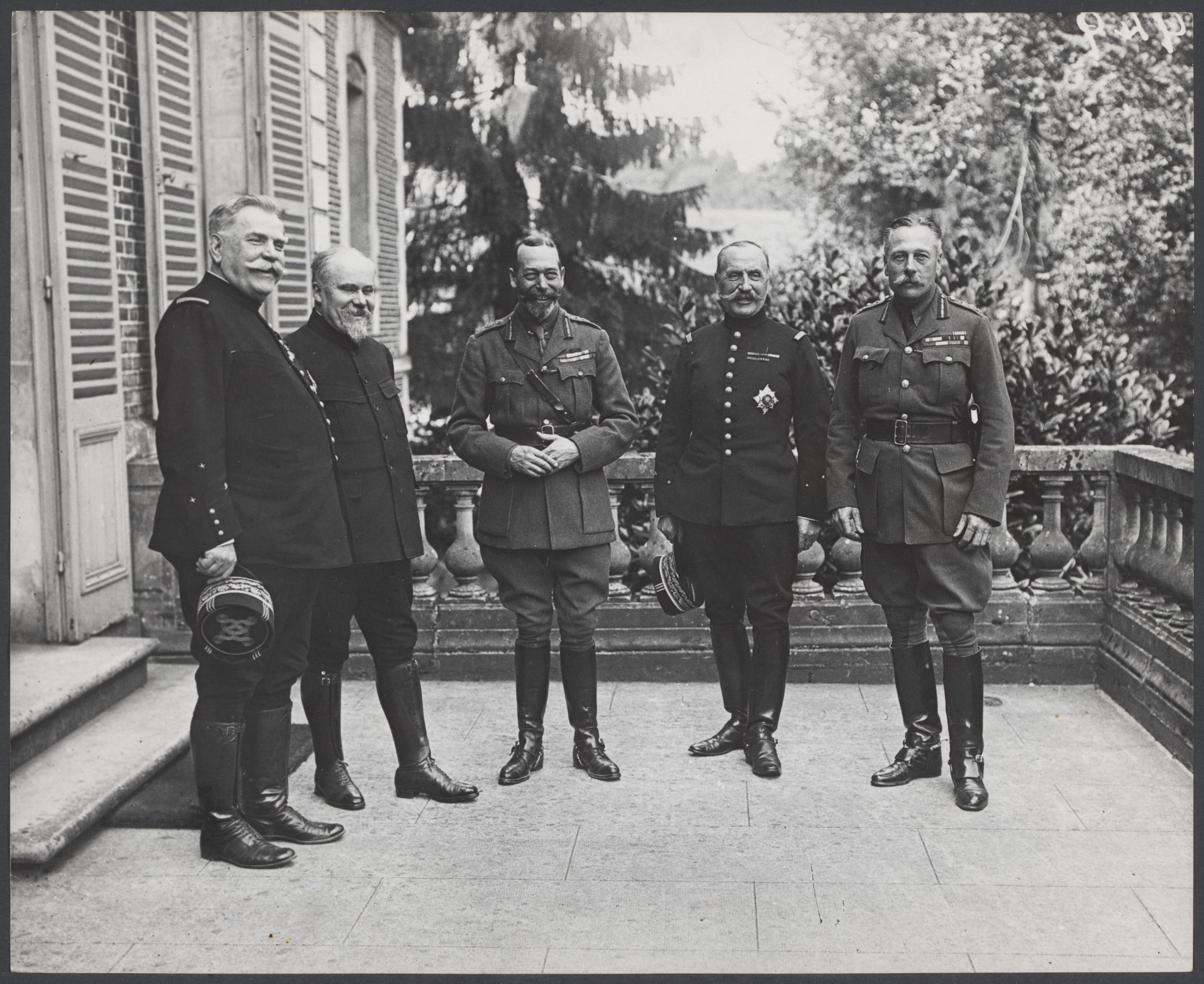
British and French leaders at Beauquesne, France, August 1916. From left to right: General Joseph Joffre, Raymond Poincaré, King George V, General Ferdinand Foch, General Sir Douglas Haig.

From 1 July to 18 November 1916, Haig directed the British portion of the Battle of the Somme, which has since then been come to be seen to epitomize the supposed futility of the war itself. On 15 August, amidst the ongoing battle, Haig was honoured with a Grand Cross of the Royal Victorian Order.

Haig's leadership during the Somme has been extensively debated. The initial bombardment on 1 July, the first day of the battle, saw excessive use of shrapnel shells, contributing to the staggering casualties – over 57,000 British and imperial soldiers were killed, wounded or missing in action on the first day alone, mainly suffered by General Rawlinson's Fourth Army. Critics argue that Haig underestimated the need for high-explosive shells to destroy German defences. However, Haig wasn't entirely to blame; as early as January 1915, he'd recognised the importance of high-explosive shells and pressed Major General Stanley von Donop, Master-General of the Ordnance, for increased production.

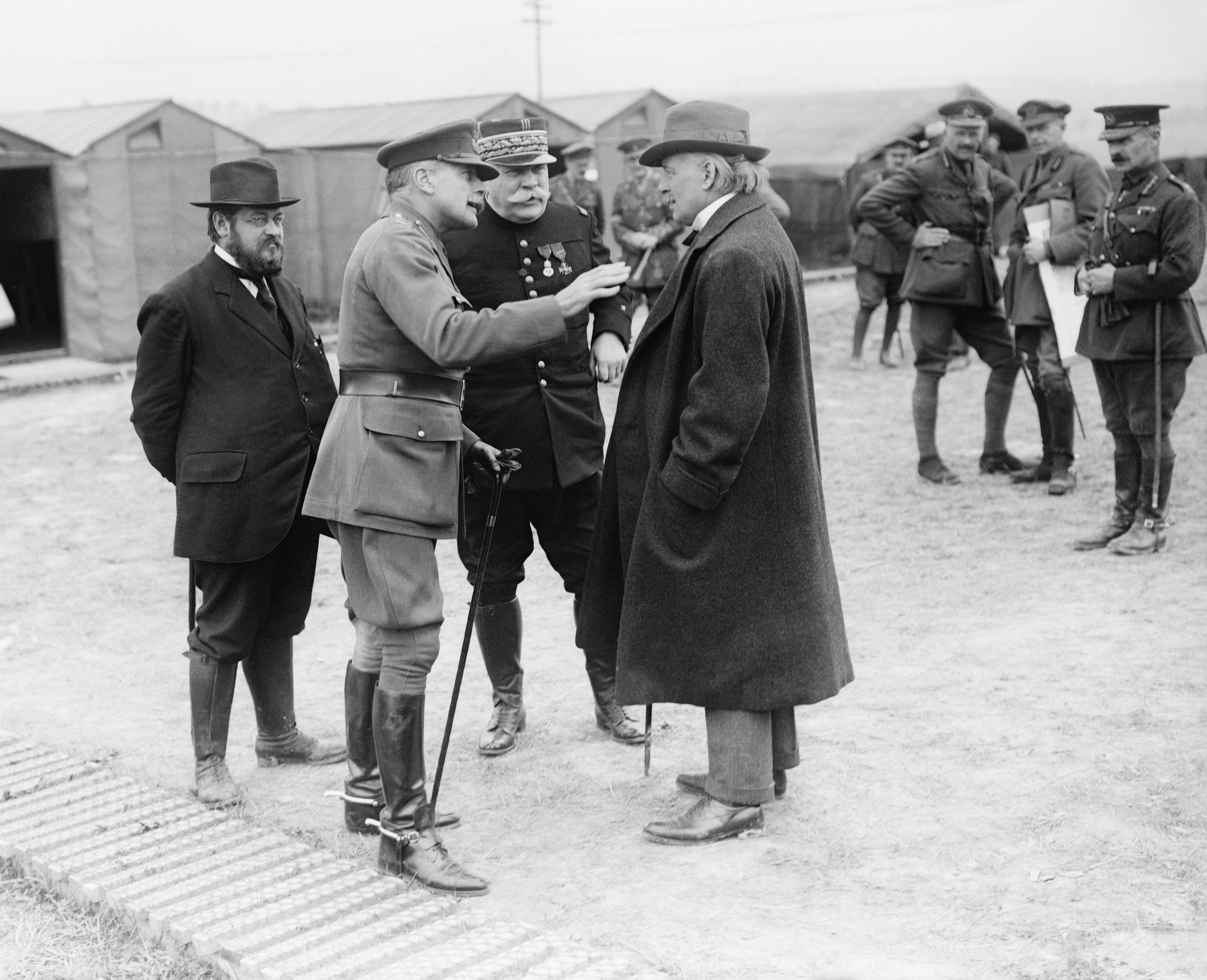
General Haig (second left) in discussion with David Lloyd George in September 1916.

=== 1917 ===
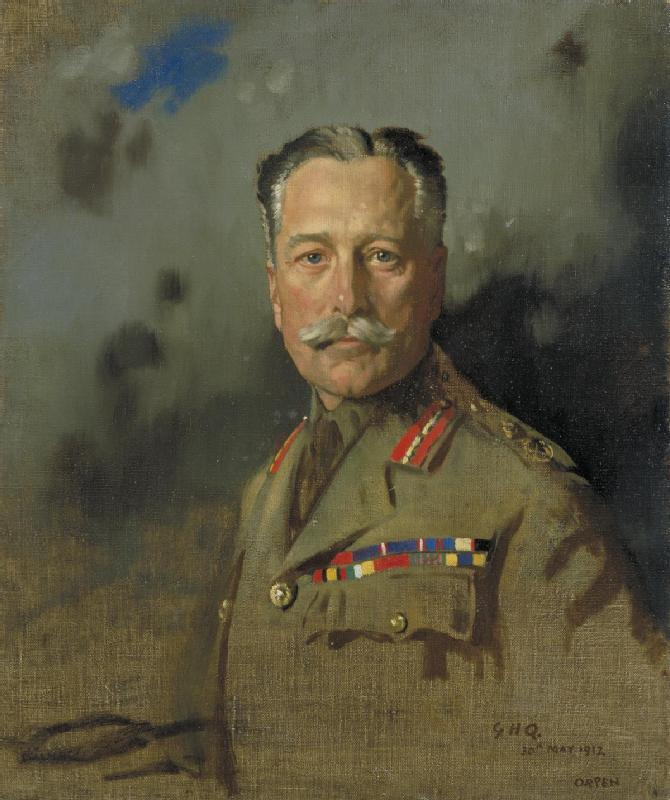
Portrait of Haig at General Headquarters, France, by Sir William Orpen, May 1917

On 1 January 1917, Haig was made a field marshal. King George V wrote him a handwritten note:

By your conspicuous services you have fully merited this great position. I know this will be welcomed by the whole Army in France, whose confidence you have won. I hope you will look upon this as a New Year's gift from myself and the country.

Lloyd George, who had become prime minister in December 1916, infuriated Haig and Robertson by placing the BEF under the command of the new French commander-in-chief, Robert Nivelle. The failure of the Nivelle offensive in April 1917 (which Haig had been required to support with a British offensive at Arras) and the subsequent French mutiny and political crisis, discredited Lloyd George's plans for Anglo-French co-operation. During the second half of 1917, Haig conducted an offensive at Passchendaele (also known as the Third Battle of Ypres). Haig hoped to liberate the North Sea coast of Belgium from which German U-boats were operating, provided that there was assistance from the French, support from Britain and that Russia stayed in the war.

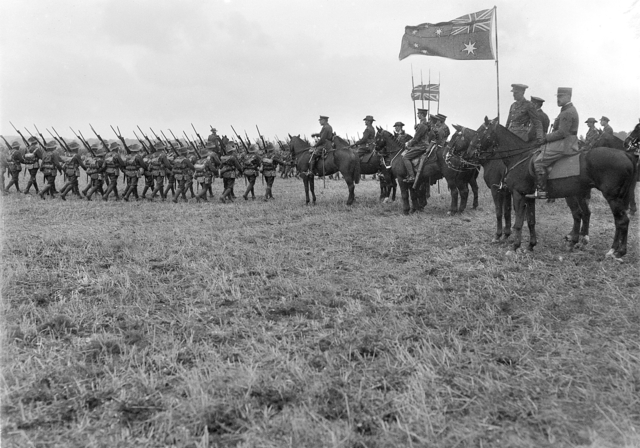
Field Marshal Sir Douglas Haig reviews the 5th Australian Division at Ebblinghem, 29 August 1917.

The Admiralty, led by John Jellicoe, believed that the U-boat threat could jeopardise Britain's ability to continue fighting. Another objective was to commit German resources to Belgian Flanders, away from the Aisne sector in France, where the French mutiny had been worst, to give the French Army time to recover. Haig was worried that the Russian Revolution would result in Russia and Germany making peace and forming an alliance. If this happened the German troops located on the Eastern Front would be transferred to the west by late 1917 or early 1918, making a decisive victory much more difficult.

The Third Battle of Ypres caused the British far fewer casualties than the Battle of the Somme and the substantial success of the occupation of the ridges around Ypres, the first stage of the offensive strategy and inflicted comparable losses on the Germans, who were far less capable of replacing losses and which contributed to their defeat in 1918.

==== Cambrai ====
By the end of 1917, Lloyd George felt able to assert authority over the generals and at the end of the year was able to sack the First Sea Lord Admiral Jellicoe. Over the objections of Haig and Robertson, an inter-Allied Supreme War Council was set up. When the council was inaugurated (11 November), Lloyd George attributed the success of the Central Powers to unity and scoffed at recent Allied "victories", saying he wished "it had not been necessary to win so many of them". His speech angered several leading politicians and Secretary of State for War Edward Stanley, 17th Earl of Derby assured Haig of his backing. Haig and Pétain objected to a common command, arguing that coalitions work better when one power is dominant, which was no longer the case now that British military power had increased relative to that of France. Lloyd George got his wish to send British forces to Italy, after the Italian defeat at Caporetto in November. Haig knew that manpower was scarce in the BEF and at home and wrote to Robertson that an offensive at Cambrai would stem the flow of reinforcements to Italy; Robertson delayed the despatch of two divisions.

Plans for a III Corps attack at Cambrai had been proposed as far back as May. Haig had informed the War Office (5 June) that "events have proved the utility of Tanks". The plan was to trap German troops between the River Sensée and Canal du Nord, with the cavalry to seize the Saint-Quentin Canal crossings, then exploit north-east. The first day objective was the high ground around Bourlon Wood and Haig was to review progress after 48 hours.

The Third Army attacked at Cambrai early on 20 November with 1,000 guns (using a surprise predicted barrage rather than a preliminary bombardment) and nine tank battalions. On the first day the British penetrated 5 miles (8 km) on a 6-mile (10 km) front with only 4,000 casualties, limited by blown bridges and the shortness of the November day. The 51st (Highland) Division was held up at Flesquières village, which fell the following day. Haig's intelligence chief Brigadier-General John Charteris told him that the Germans would not be able to reinforce for 48 hours and James Marshall-Cornwall, then a junior intelligence officer, later an admiring biographer of Haig, alleged that Charteris refused to have reported fresh German divisions shown on the situation map as he did not want to weaken Haig's resolution.

Haig visited the battlefield (21 November), inspecting the fighting at Bourlon Wood through his binoculars. He thought the attacks "feeble and uncoordinated" and was disappointed at the lack of grip by corps and division commanders and encountering 1st Cavalry Division, which had been ordered to fall back, resisted the temptation to countermand the order. At around 9 pm he decided to continue the attack on Bourlon Wood, a decision which has been much criticised but which made good military sense at the time and was supported by Julian Byng, although the political need for a clear victory may have been a factor. The offensive continued but with diminishing returns. Bourlon Wood fell on 23 November but German counter-attacks had begun. Haig arrived at a Third Army planning meeting (26 November) and ordered further attacks the following day but then had to bow to Byng deciding to go onto the defensive. Haig complained that the lack of extra divisions had prevented a breakthrough, a view described by one biographer as "self-deception, pure and simple".

Some of the gains were retaken after 30 November, when the Germans made their first counter-offensive against the British since 1914, using new Sturmtruppen tactics. GHQ intelligence had failed to piece together warnings. British casualties had mounted to over 40,000 by 3 December, with German losses somewhat less. One biographer argues that the initial success at Cambrai helped to save Haig's job but another view is that the ultimate disappointment did more damage to Haig's political credibility than Passchendaele. Lloyd George was particularly angry at the embarrassing Cambrai reverse, but Haig's support amongst the Army, the public and many politicians made sacking him impossible; a plan that Haig be "promoted" to a sinecure, as generalissimo of British forces, was scotched when Lord Derby threatened resignation.

Asked to provide a statement to the House of Commons, Haig attributed the German success to "one cause and one alone ... lack of training on the part of junior officers and NCOs and men", a verdict supported by the court of enquiry which, at Derby's instigation, Haig ordered, although the enquiry also criticised "higher commanders" for failing to enforce defensive doctrine. In a later report to Robertson Haig accepted the blame, stating that the troops had been tired as a result of the attack on Bourlon Wood. Although Haig defended Charteris, he was required to dismiss him. Robertson had arrived at Haig's Headquarters with orders (signed by Derby) for his dismissal, in case Haig refused to do as he was asked. A common criticism is that Haig only accepted intelligence from Charteris (who told him what he wanted to hear) and did not cross-check it with other intelligence.

=== 1918 ===
==== Political manoeuvres ====
Over lunch at 10 Downing Street with Derby and Lloyd George in January, Haig predicted that the war would end within a year because of the "internal state of Germany". Haig left the War cabinet with the impression that he thought the Germans would launch small attacks on the scale of Cambrai. Haig recommended that the British draw in German reserves by renewing the offensive around Ypres, which did not meet with political approval. By now Haig's 1917 offensives were being criticised in the press and in Parliament, where J.C. Wedgwood openly demanded a change of command. The purge of Haig's staff continued, with the removal of Sir Roland Maxwell (Quartermaster-General) and Lt-Gen Launcelot Kiggell as BEF Chief of Staff.

In January the Cabinet Minister Jan Smuts and the Cabinet Secretary Maurice Hankey were sent to France to discreetly see whether any of the Army Commanders were willing to replace Haig – none were. At the Supreme War Council at Versailles Haig and Pétain complained of shortage of troops, but Haig's political credibility was so low that Hankey wrote that they "made asses of themselves". It was agreed that an Allied General Reserve be set up, under Foch with Henry Wilson as his deputy; Haig was reluctant to hand over divisions and argued against a common command, claiming that it would be "unconstitutional" for him to take orders from a foreign general, and that he did not have the reserves to spare. Alfred Milner thought Haig's stance "desperately stupid".

Lloyd George proposed that the CIGS be reduced to his pre-1915 powers (i.e. reporting to the Secretary of State for War, not direct to the Cabinet) and that the British military representative at the Supreme War Council in Versailles be Deputy CIGS and a member of the Army Council (i.e. empowered to issue orders to Haig). He offered Robertson a choice of remaining as CIGS with reduced powers or else accepting demotion to Deputy CIGS at Versailles. Derby summoned Haig to London, expecting him to support him in backing Robertson. In a private meeting with Lloyd George, Haig agreed with Robertson's position that the CIGS should himself be the delegate to Versailles, or else that the Versailles delegate be clearly subordinate to the CIGS to preserve unity of command. However, he accepted that the War Cabinet must ultimately make the decision, and according to Lloyd George "put up no fight for Robertson" and persuaded Derby not to resign. Haig thought Robertson egotistical, coarse, power-crazed and not "a gentleman" and was unhappy at the way Robertson had allowed divisions to be diverted. Henry Wilson now became CIGS, with Henry Rawlinson as British military representative at Versailles. Although Haig had been suspicious of Wilson, they gradually established a warily respectful relationship.

==== German Michael offensive ====
By March 1918 Germany's Western Front armies had been reinforced by the release of troops from the Eastern Front. At this point British troops were tired and weakened, and British divisions had been cut in size from 12 battalions to 9. Allied intelligence did not fall for German deceptions that they might attack in Italy or the Balkans, but thought that the main attack might fall in the Cambrai-St Quentin sector. Haig inspected the Fifth Army (7–9 March) and noted widespread concerns, which he shared, at lack of reserves. As late as 17 March, Edgar William Cox, who had replaced Charteris as Intelligence Chief, predicted that the German Offensive was not yet immediately imminent. By 20 March, deployment of German trench mortars had been reported by deserters, and British artillery began some spoiling fire.

Germany launched an attack, Operation Michael (21 March 1918), with a force larger than the entire BEF and enjoying superiority of 5:1 over Hubert Gough's Fifth Army, which were spread thinly over line recently taken over from the French. Haig was initially calm on 21 March, as owing to the communications of the time GHQ was "an information vacuum" where news often took over a day to reach him, and spent much of the day entertaining foreign dignitaries including the United States Secretary of War Newton D. Baker. The Third Army retreated as planned from the Flesquières salient. With three-quarters of the 50-mile (80 km) front under attack, the British troops fought hard and the Germans failed to reach their first-day objectives. However, lacking reserves Gough had to retreat behind the Crozat Canal. 22 March saw the Fifth Army retreat to the Somme; Haig still anticipated further German attacks in Champagne or Arras. The Germans did not initially realise the importance of Amiens as an objective.

Haig did not speak to or visit Gough until 23 March. That day Haig arranged for reserves to be sent down from Flanders. Formal orders were issued to the Fifth Army to maintain contact with the Third Army to their north and the French to their south. After initial optimism, Tim Travers has written of "panic" setting in amongst senior officers at GHQ on 23 March, and there is evidence that a retreat towards the Channel Ports may have been considered.

==== Doullens ====
Haig had a GHQ Reserve which was massed in the north, 72 hours' march away, to protect the Channel Ports. The French Commander-in-Chief, Pétain, agreed to place two French armies under Émile Fayolle as a reserve in the Somme valley, but could not agree to Haig's request to send 20 French divisions to Amiens.

24 March was "probably the most traumatic day (Haig) had endured since" First Ypres in 1914. Half of BEF supplies came into Le Havre, Rouen and Dieppe and passed by train through Amiens, making it a major choke point. Planning that winter had left open the question of whether the BEF would retreat southwest or form "an island" around the Channel Ports through which Haig's armies drew the other half of their supplies. A retreat on the ports does not seem to have been decided until some days after 21 March.

This is one of the occasions where doubt has been cast on the authenticity of Haig's diary. For example, Haig's typed diary – probably based on notes prepared in April – describes Pétain as "almost unbalanced and most anxious", claiming that after attending a Cabinet meeting in Paris, where he had been ordered to "cover Paris at all costs", he threatened to retreat on Paris, leaving the British right flank uncovered. Tim Travers argues that Pétain said at the meeting that he would only retreat on Paris if Haig retreated on the Channel Ports, and that Pétain had come away satisfied that Haig would not break contact. In a postwar exchange of letters with Haig Pétain denied that he had ordered a retreat on Paris or had threatened Haig that he might, a recollection which Herbert Lawrence appears to have supported. It has been suggested that Haig and Lawrence may simply have misunderstood his intentions, and that any factual errors in Haig's diary were honest if mistaken recollections.

Haig's letter of 25 March, sent via Maxime Weygand, asked for 20 French divisions to cover the southern British flank as the BEF fought its way back "covering the Channel Ports". The letter is ambiguous and does not specifically mention a retreat "to" the ports. Sheffield argues that orders to Third Army were not a precursor to retreat but "a means to an end", pointing to orders for, if needs be, a counterattack onto the northern flank of the German attackers, and also argues that although GHQ had a duty to consider contingency plans, unlike in 1940, evacuation was never actually likely. Wilson claimed that Haig suggested Pétain be appointed Allied generalissimo (which is not consistent with Haig's later claim that Pétain was unwilling to help the British) and that he proposed Ferdinand Foch over Haig's objections.

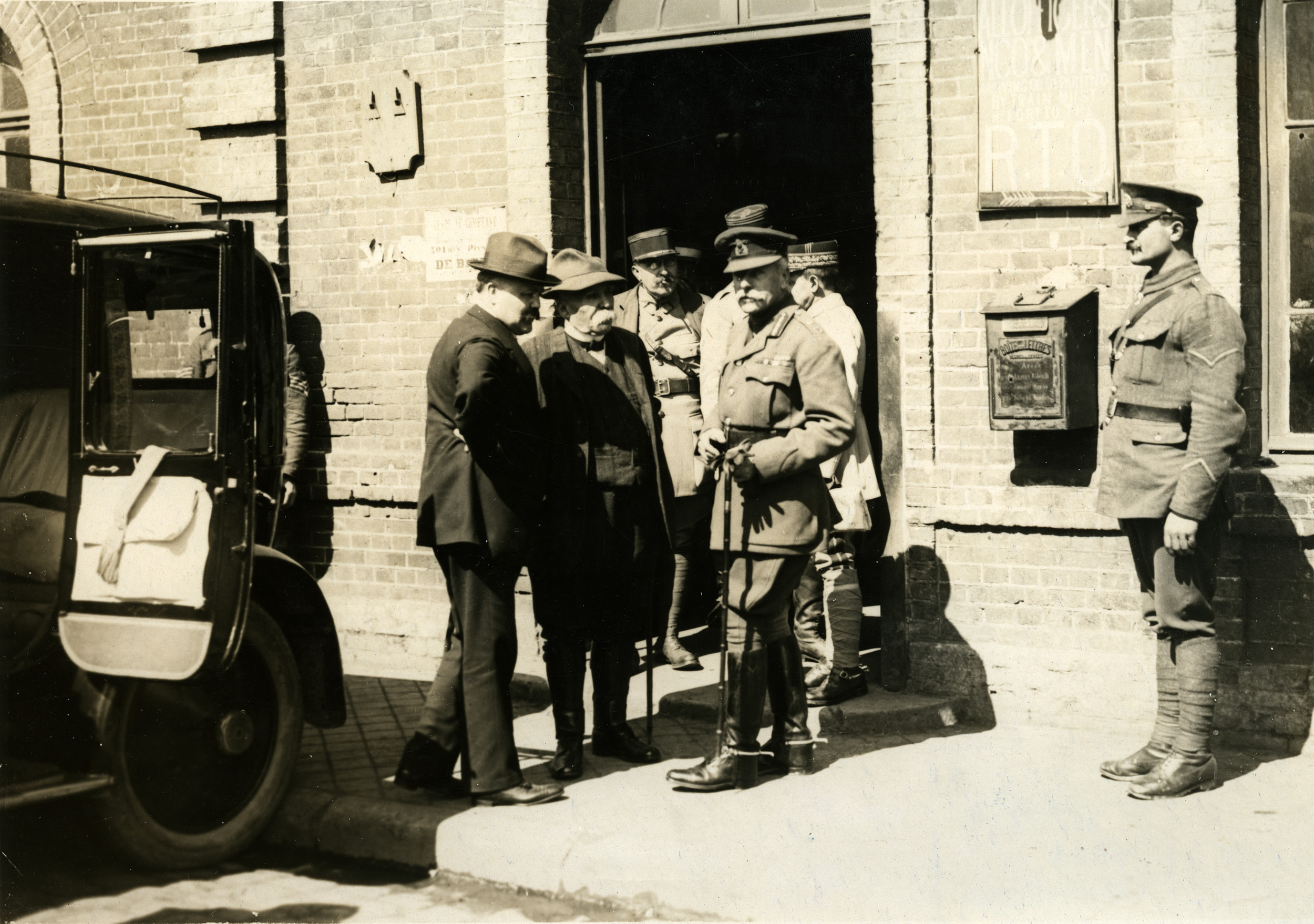
Haig and Clemenceau at Doullens, April 1918.

At the Doullens Conference (26 March), Haig accepted the appointment of Foch to coordinate reserves of all nationalities wherever he saw fit. In his typed diary Haig claimed much of the credit for Foch's appointment and to have insisted that he have wider powers over Pétain than Georges Clemenceau had wanted to grant him. Milner, who represented the British government at Doullens, recorded that Clemenceau was unhappy with Pétain's recent efforts, but claimed that he himself had persuaded Haig to accept the appointment of Foch; Haig's official biographer Duff Cooper gave Haig the credit but commented that the idea had probably occurred to several participants simultaneously.

After a German offensive near Arras ("Mars", 28 March) was beaten back, between 29 and 31 March the Germans pushed on Amiens. A Canadian brigade took part in an action at Moreuil Wood. Attacks on 4 April (Villers-Bretonneux, east of Amiens) and 5 April on the Third Army front were beaten back by British and Australian forces, although contingency plans were still being prepared to cover Rouen and Le Havre in case Amiens fell.

==== German Georgette offensive ====
To ALL RANKS OF THE BRITISH ARMY IN FRANCE AND FLANDERS Three weeks ago to-day the enemy began his terrific attacks against us on a fifty-mile [80 km] front. His objects are to separate us from the French, to take the Channel Ports and destroy the British Army. In spite of throwing already 106 Divisions into the battle and enduring the most reckless sacrifice of human life, he has as yet made little progress towards his goals. We owe this to the determined fighting and self-sacrifice of our troops. Words fail me to express the admiration which I feel for the splendid resistance offered by all ranks of our Army under the most trying circumstances. Many amongst us now are tired. To those I would say that Victory will belong to the side which holds out the longest. The French Army is moving rapidly and in great force to our support. There is no other course open to us but to fight it out. Every position must be held to the last man: there must be no retirement. With our backs to the wall and believing in the justice of our cause each one of us must fight on to the end. The safety of our homes and the Freedom of mankind alike depend upon the conduct of each one of us at this critical moment. (Signed) D. Haig F.M. Commander-in-Chief British Armies in France, 11 April.

Lloyd George demanded Haig sack Gough, and when Haig was reluctant he was given a direct order to do so by Derby. Haig offered to resign; Lloyd George wanted to accept, but the other ministers, and Henry Wilson, thought there was no obvious successor.

During the second major German offensive, "Georgette" in Flanders (9 April), Haig issued his famous order that his men must carry on fighting "With Our Backs to the Wall and believing in the Justice of our Cause" to protect "the safety of our homes and the Freedom of mankind". Just as "Michael" had swept over the Cambrai and the Somme battlefields, won at such cost by Haig's own offensives in previous years, this one swept over Passchendaele although not Ypres itself. The offensive threatened Hazebrouck, "the Amiens of the north", a key railhead through which supplies were brought from the Channel ports.

Foch had earlier refused to send four French divisions to Flanders but now redeployed Paul Maistre's Tenth French Army to the Somme sector, freeing up British forces. During a renewed attack (17 April) Foch drew attention to the valour of the British at First Ypres and refused to send further French reinforcements so as to keep a strategic reserve. 24 April saw a further unsuccessful German attack at Villers-Bretonneux near Amiens, featuring the first tank-to-tank combat. Haig was suspicious of Foch's request to move British divisions to the French sector to free up French reserves, worrying that this might lead to "a permanent Amalgam" of French and British forces. At a meeting on 27 April meeting the dispute was smoothed over, and British IX Corps moved to the French sector. On 30 April Erich Ludendorff called a halt to the Flanders offensive.

Although some American divisions were now serving with the British forces, Haig thought John J. Pershing "very obstinate and stupid" for refusing to integrate US troops with Allied units. At Abbeville (2 May) it was agreed that in the event of renewed attack British forces would retreat south if necessary and abandon the Channel ports rather than lose touch with the French.

The near-debacle of March 1918 was an object of political controversy. Repington wrote that it was "the worst defeat in the history of the Army". Andrew Bonar Law claimed in a House of Commons debate (23 April) that Haig and Pétain had agreed the extension of the British line, which was not wholly true as in January 1918 the Supreme War Council had ordered a longer extension than Haig and Pétain had agreed between themselves in December 1917. Lloyd George was accused (in the Maurice Debate of 9 May 1918 in the House of Commons) of having hoarded troops in the UK to make it harder for Haig to launch offensives. Lloyd George misled the House of Commons in claiming that Haig's forces were stronger (1.75 million men) at the start of 1918 than they had been a year earlier (1.5 million men) – in fact the increase was caused by an increase of 335,000 in the number of labourers, and Haig had fewer combat infantry holding a longer stretch of front. Haig had opposed Maurice in taking his concerns into public, but was disappointed at how Lloyd George was able to get off the hook with a "claptrap speech". Maurice believed he had saved Haig from dismissal.

==== German Bluecher offensive ====
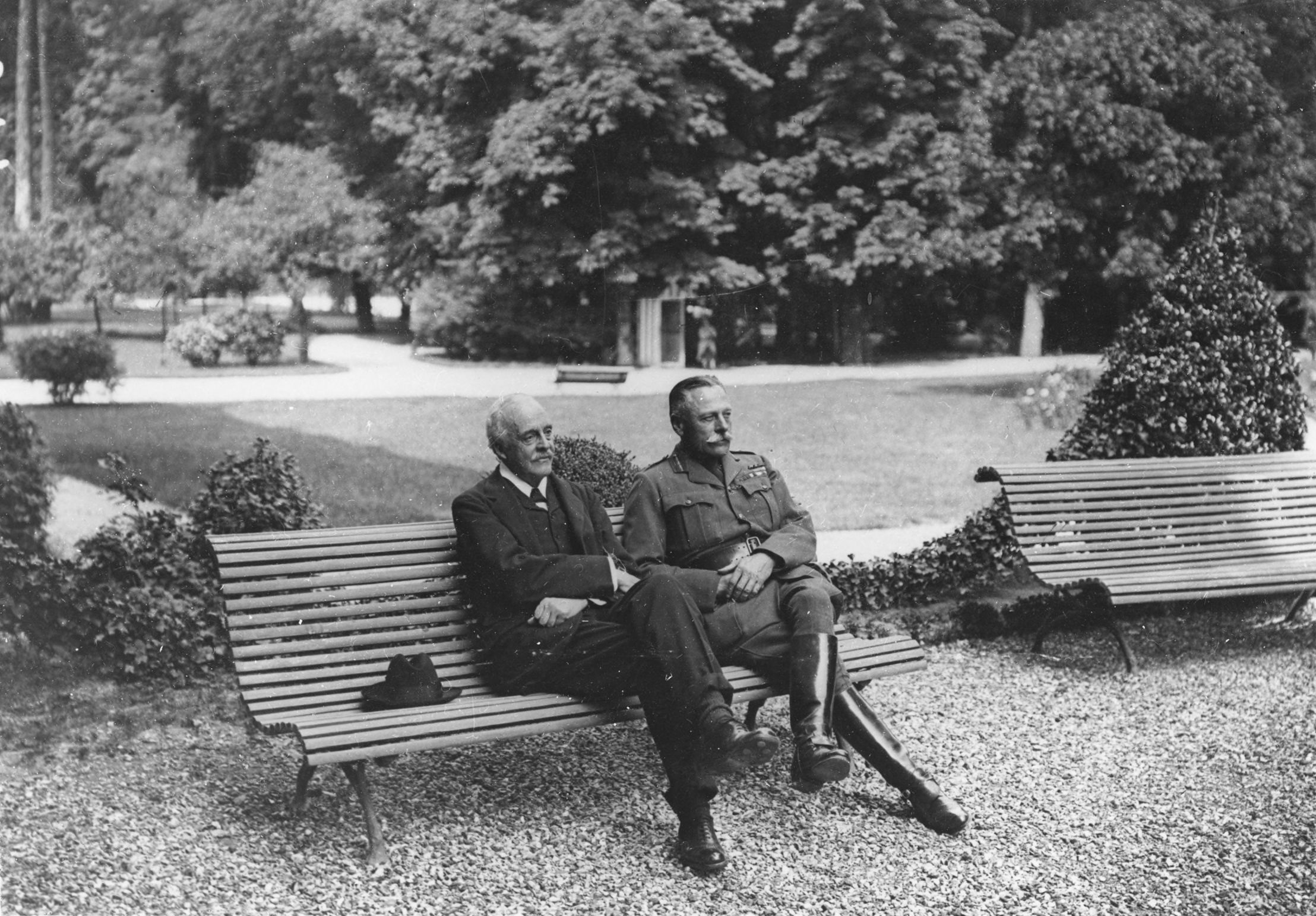
Haig and Arthur Balfour at Versailles, France, July 1918.

By late spring the BEF had taken just over 300,000 casualties. Battalions had had to be brought in from the Middle East. Haig spent time touring his forces in May. Haig's wife reported rumours that he was to be brought home as Commander-in-Chief, Home Forces; when Wilson denied the rumours to Haig, Haig recorded that "no one has been chosen yet!" to replace him.

A third major German offensive against the French on the Aisne ("Blücher"), starting on 27 May, overwhelmed Hamilton-Gordon's IX British Corps which had been sent there to refit after being involved in "Michael" and "Georgette". At a conference at Versailles (1 June) there was friction between Haig, who was worried that the Germans would attack his sector again, and Foch, who demanded that the US divisions trained by the British be moved to his sector to release French divisions. Foch moved French forces down from Flanders, but there was further friction at a meeting in Paris about Foch's request to move British reserves south. Haig threatened to appeal to the British government if he felt Foch was demanding too many British troops, so it was agreed that Haig and Foch should meet more frequently, and in time they developed a good working relationship.

Cooperation improved when the Germans launched their "Gneisenau" Offensive on 9 June. Lloyd George and Milner gave their full support to Foch on moving four British divisions. They told Haig that he should consider himself subordinate to Foch for the time being.

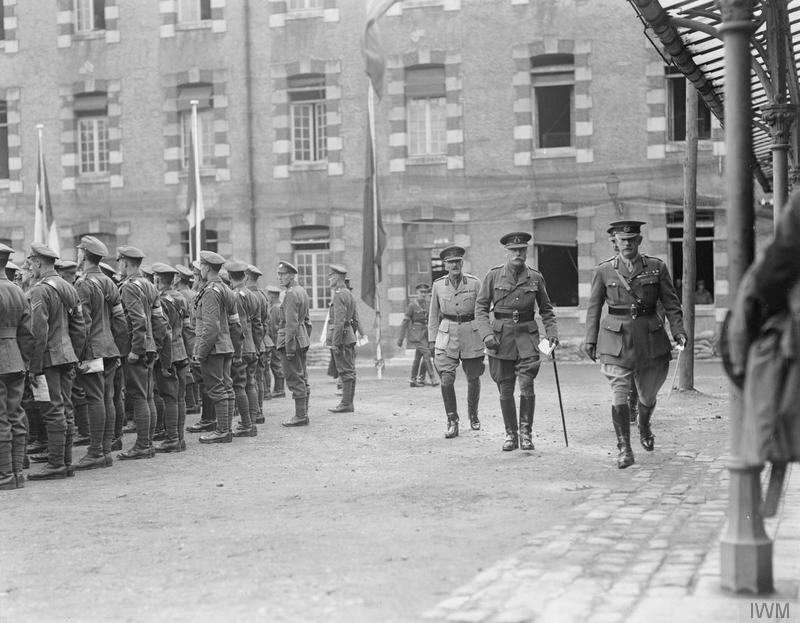
Haig attending a service on the fourth anniversary of the declaration of war at Montreuil, France, 4 August 1918. Stood to his left is Lieutenant General Fowke, the BEF's adjutant general, while his CGS, Lieutenant General Lawrence, Kiggell's successor, is on his right.

With another German attack imminent, Herbert Lawrence was asked (Haig was on leave in England) to send eight divisions – he sent only two. Haig thought this was breaching an agreement of 1 July that covering Paris and the Somme was to take priority. Wilson consulted the War Cabinet then told Haig to "exercise his judgement" about holding the British line. Haig felt that they would take credit for Foch's victory but might dismiss him if disaster befell the British forces. The German "Peace Offensive" began against the French at Rheims on the same day. Haig eventually agreed that the French could use XXII Corps if necessary "for exploitation".

==== Turn of the Tide and the Hundred Days ====
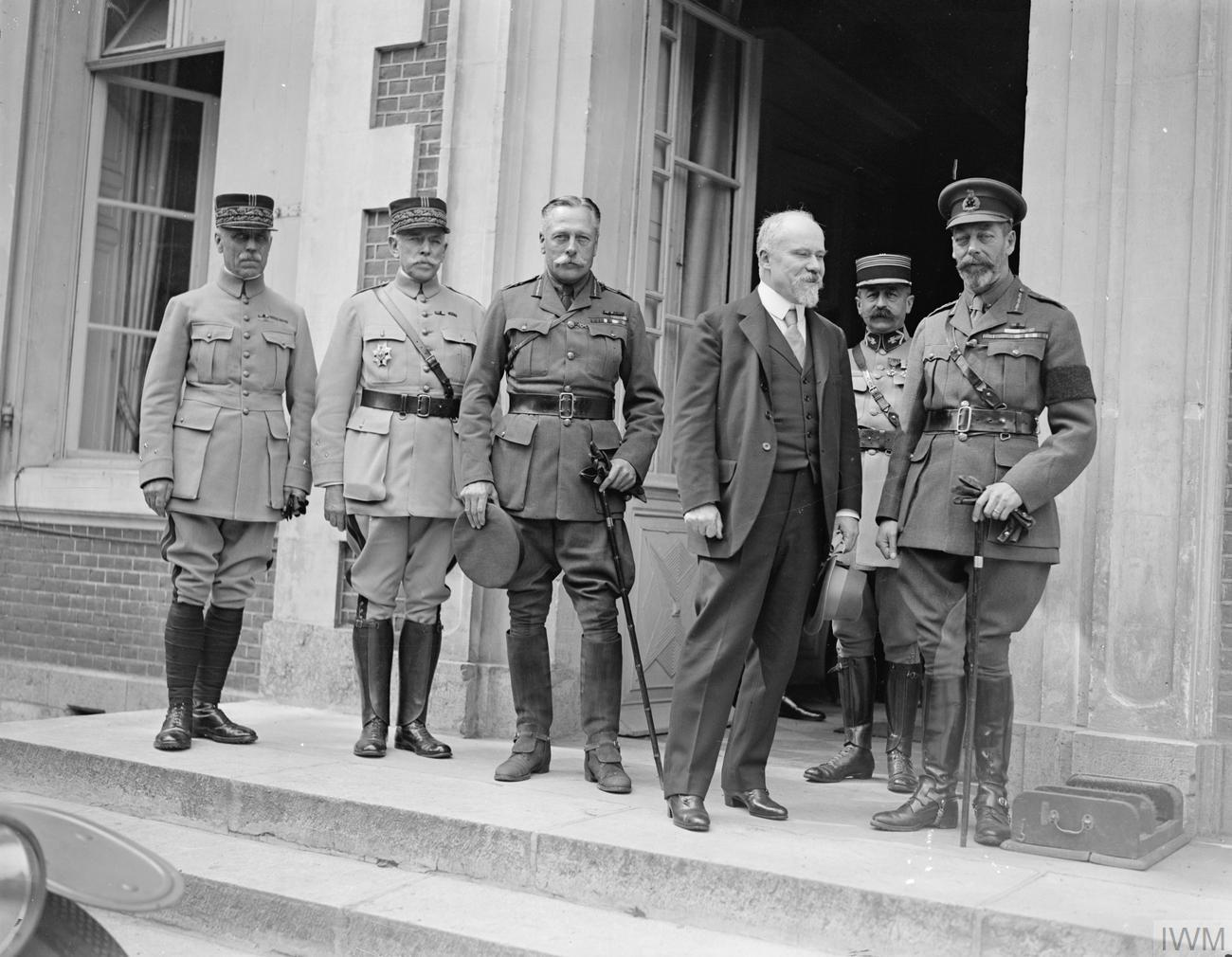
King George V, French President Raymond Poincaré and Haig at GHQ at Montreuil, 7 August 1918

In July and August the Germans were defeated at the Second Battle of the Marne and Amiens. The latter victory was described by General Erich Ludendorff as "The Black Day of the German Army" after mass surrenders of German troops. On 11 August Haig, contrary to the wishes of Marshal Foch, insisted on a halt to the Amiens offensive and launched a new attack on 21 August between the Scarpe and the Ancre. As with his previous offensives in 1916 and 1917, Haig encouraged his subordinates to aim for ambitious objectives, in this case a thrust from Albert to Bapaume, and this time with more success than in previous years. On 10 September Haig, on a brief visit to London, insisted that the war could end that year and asked Lord Milner (Secretary of State for War) to send all available men and transportation. Milner afterwards shared with Wilson his concerns that Haig would embark on "another Passchendaele".

Haig's forces continued to enjoy much success, but when they began to advance towards the Hindenburg Line Haig received a supposedly "personal" telegram from the CIGS Henry Wilson (31 August), warning him that he was not to take unnecessary losses in storming these fortifications. Haig, surmising that the War Cabinet were not forbidding him to attack but might dismiss him if the assault failed, telegraphed Wilson back that they were a "wretched lot" and wrote that attacking the Germans now would be less costly than allowing them time to regroup.

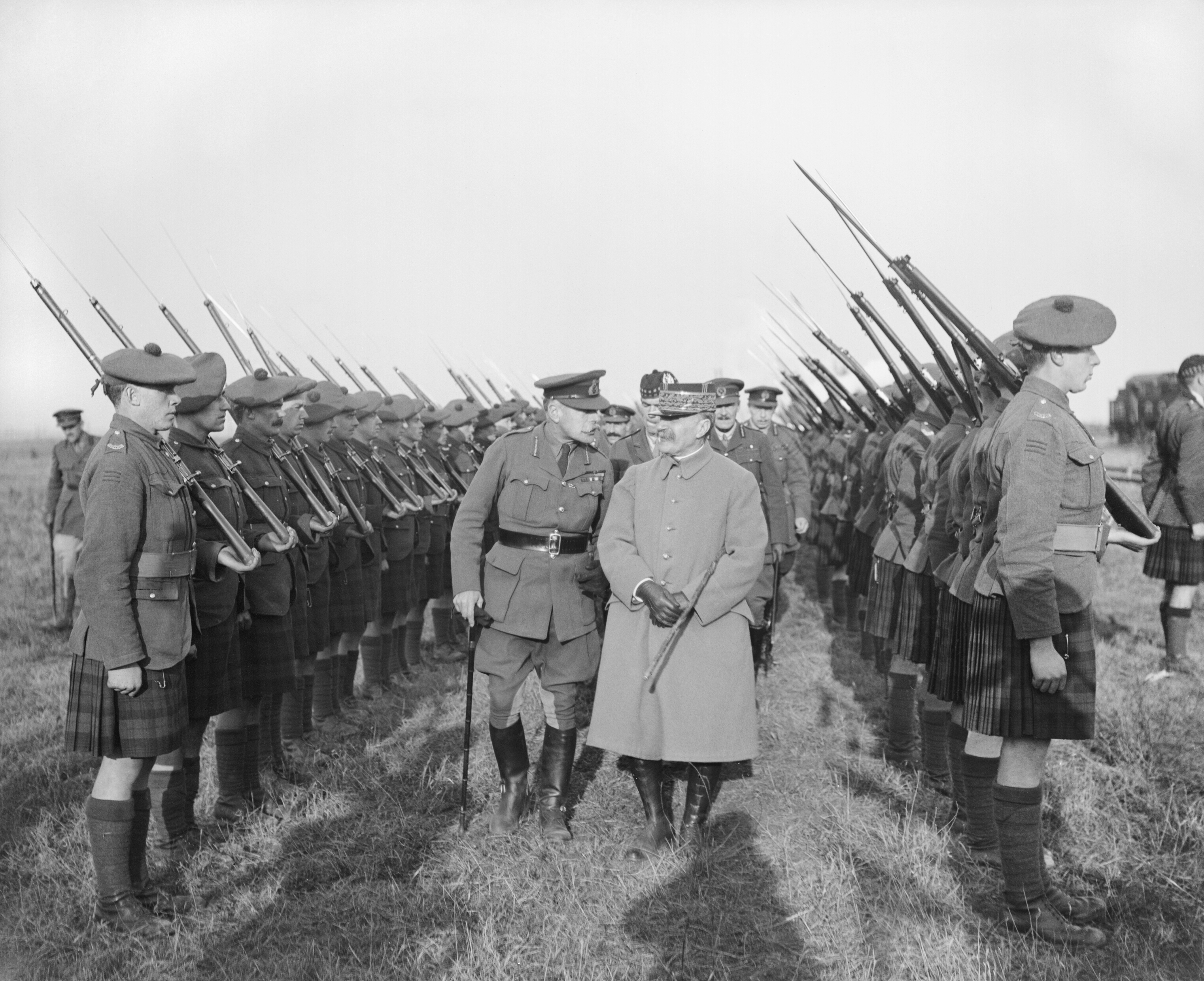
Haig and Ferdinand Foch inspecting the Gordon Highlanders, 1918

There is some dispute over how much direct operational control Haig maintained at this time, Tim Travers in particular arguing that he allowed his Army Commanders a very free hand, whilst Ferdinand Foch was exerting ever-greater influence over strategy. Haig was irritated that Foch insisted that Herbert Plumer's Second Army remain part of an Army Group commanded by the King of the Belgians, so that the French and Belgians could take credit for liberating Brussels.

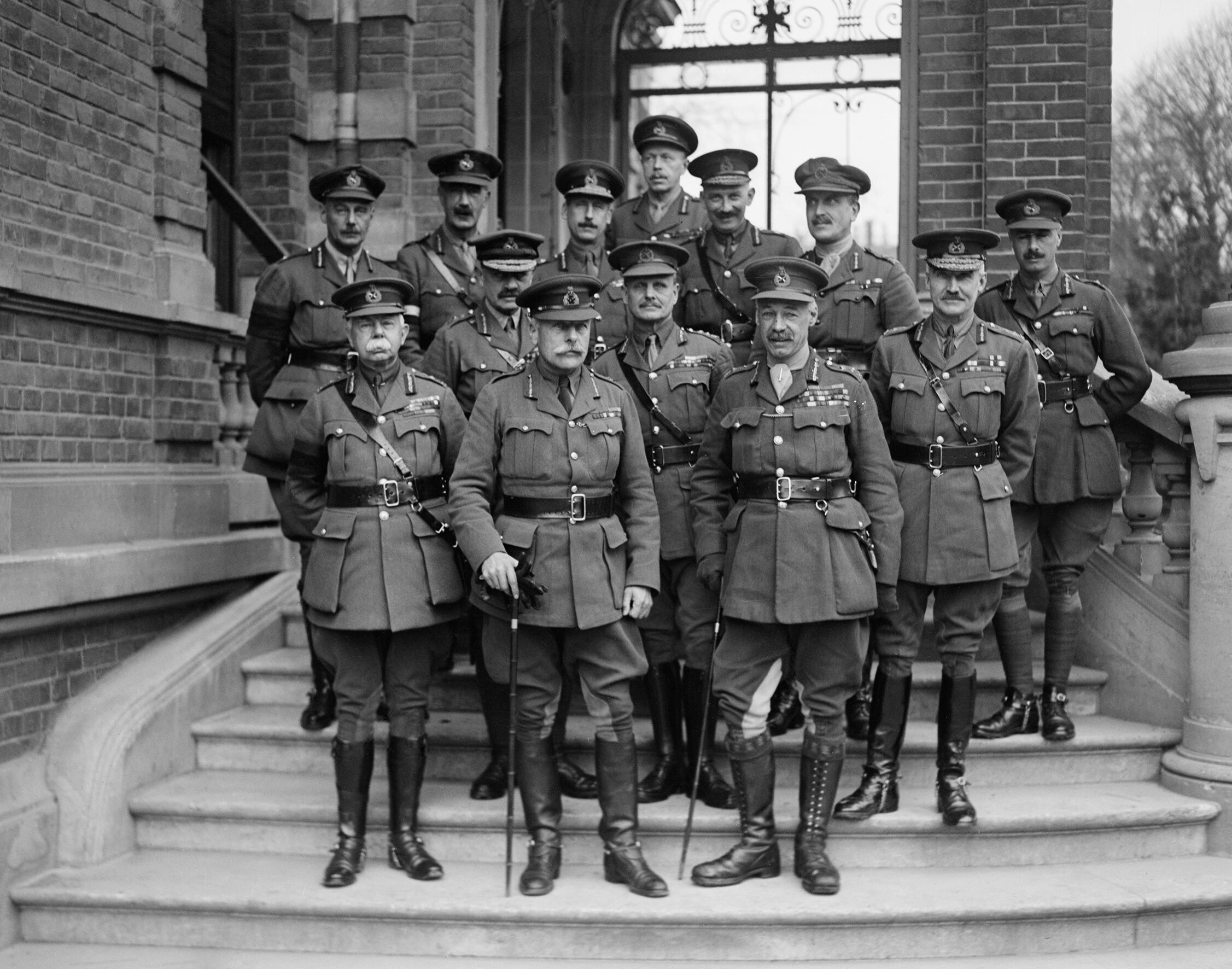
Sir Douglas Haig with his army commanders and their chiefs of staff, November 1918. Front row, left to right: Sir Herbert Plumer, Sir Douglas Haig, Sir Henry Rawlinson. Middle row, left to right: Sir Julian Byng, Sir William Birdwood, Sir Henry Horne. Back row, left to right: Sir Herbert Lawrence, Sir Charles Kavanagh, Brudenell White, Percy, Louis Vaughan, Archibald Montgomery-Massingberd, Hastings Anderson.

Germany first requested an Armistice after the penetration of the Hindenburg Line at its strongest point, St Quentin/Cambrai, on 28 September, and the almost simultaneous capitulation of Bulgaria, and discussions continued until the ceasefire on 11 November. When consulted on terms for an armistice in October, Haig stated that "Germany is not broken in the military sense. During the last weeks her forces have withdrawn fighting very bravely and in excellent order". In private correspondence Haig was more sanguine. In a mid-October letter to his wife he stated that "I think we have their army beaten now". Haig noted in his diary for 11 November that the Imperial German Army was in "very bad" condition due to insubordination and indiscipline in the ranks. Haig urged moderation, suggesting that Germany only be asked to give up Belgium and Alsace-Lorraine, and warning that humiliating terms might lead to a militarist backlash. Haig suspected Wilson, a staunch Unionist, of wanting to prolong the war as an excuse to subdue southern Ireland by bringing in conscription there. The dissolution of Austria-Hungary encouraged the politicians to demand stricter terms (although less strict than Foch or Pershing would have liked) and Germany was required to evacuate the Rhineland as well. However, once Germany had accepted the strict armistice terms, Haig suggested Germany be split into independent states at the peace treaty.

Whereas the French, American and Belgian armies combined captured 196,700 prisoners-of-war between 18 July and the end of the war, Haig's forces, with a smaller army than the French, engaged the main mass of the German Army and captured 188,700 prisoners. British daily casualty rates (3,645 per day) were heavier during this period than at the Somme (2,950) or Passchendaele (2,121), because British forces were attacking across the line, instead of being rotated through a single offensive. The military historian, Gary Sheffield, called this, the so-called Hundred Days Offensive, "by far the greatest military victory in British history".

=== Executions during the First World War ===
As the BEF's C-in-C, one of Haig's responsibilities was to give the final signature to the death warrants of British and Empire soldiers (but not Australian—these went to the Governor-General of Australia) who had been first sentenced to death by Field General Court Martial. Although the book Shot at Dawn (1983), which began the campaign for pardons, says that it is "quite incorrect" to hold Haig solely responsible as he was part of a legal process, by the late 1990s Haig was perhaps best known to the general public because of publicity which implied him to be a brutal disciplinarian—this was not the view of contemporaries. Of the 3,080 men sentenced to death in all theatres, 346 were executed, 266 (77%) were for desertion, 37 for murder and 18 for cowardice. Just over 250 of the executions took place during Haig's time as C-in-C, but only executed men's records survive, so it is hard to comment on the reasons why men were reprieved.

=== Promotion of army dentistry during the First World War ===
During the war, Haig suffered from toothache and sent for a Parisian dentist. Consequently, within months the British Army had hired a dozen dentists and, by the end of the war, there were 831. This led to the formation of the Royal Army Dental Corps in 1921.

== Later life ==
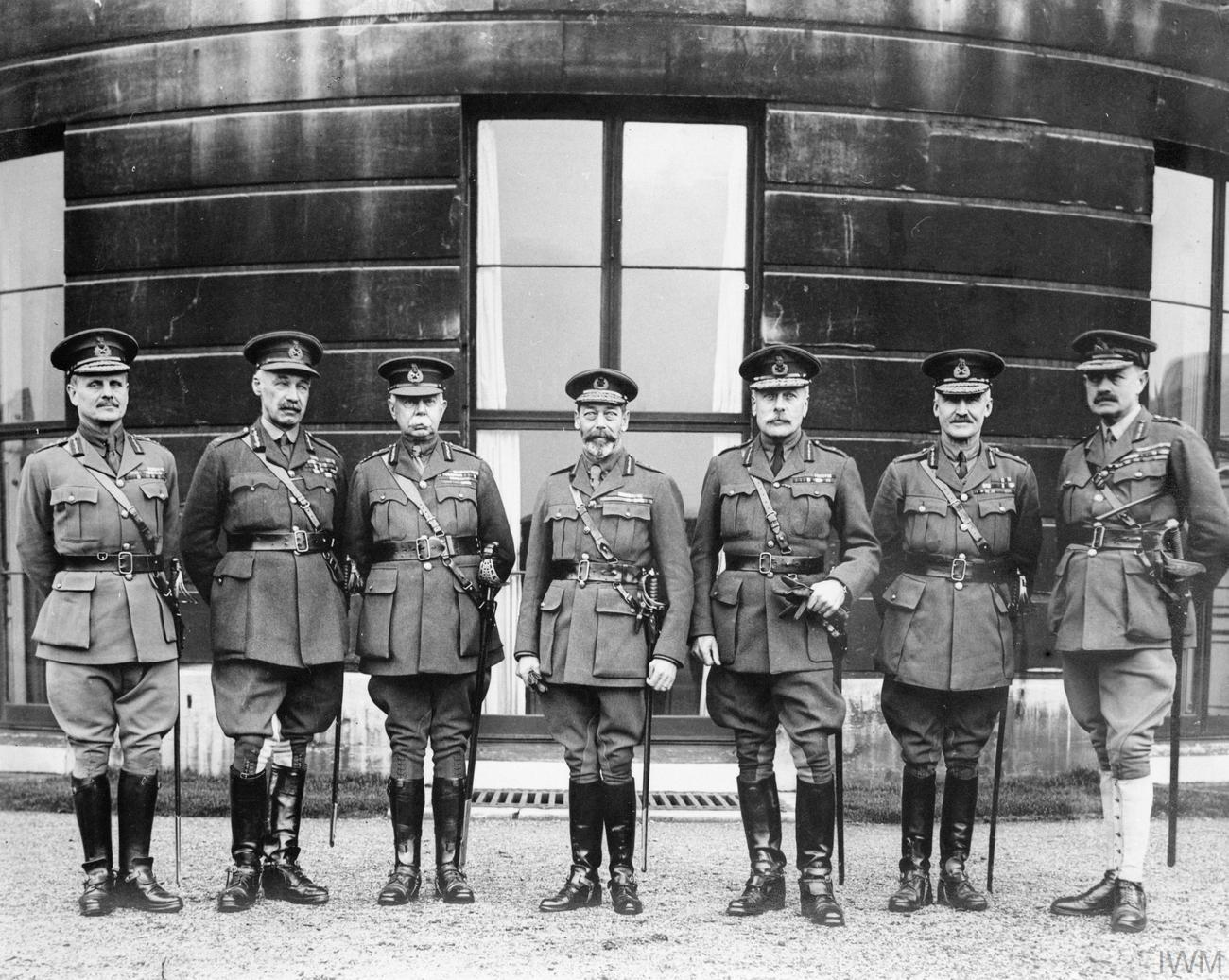
King George V (centre) with his senior commanders at Buckingham Palace, 19 December 1918. From left to right: William Birdwood, Henry Rawlinson, Herbert Plumer, George V, Douglas Haig, Henry Horne, Julian Byng.

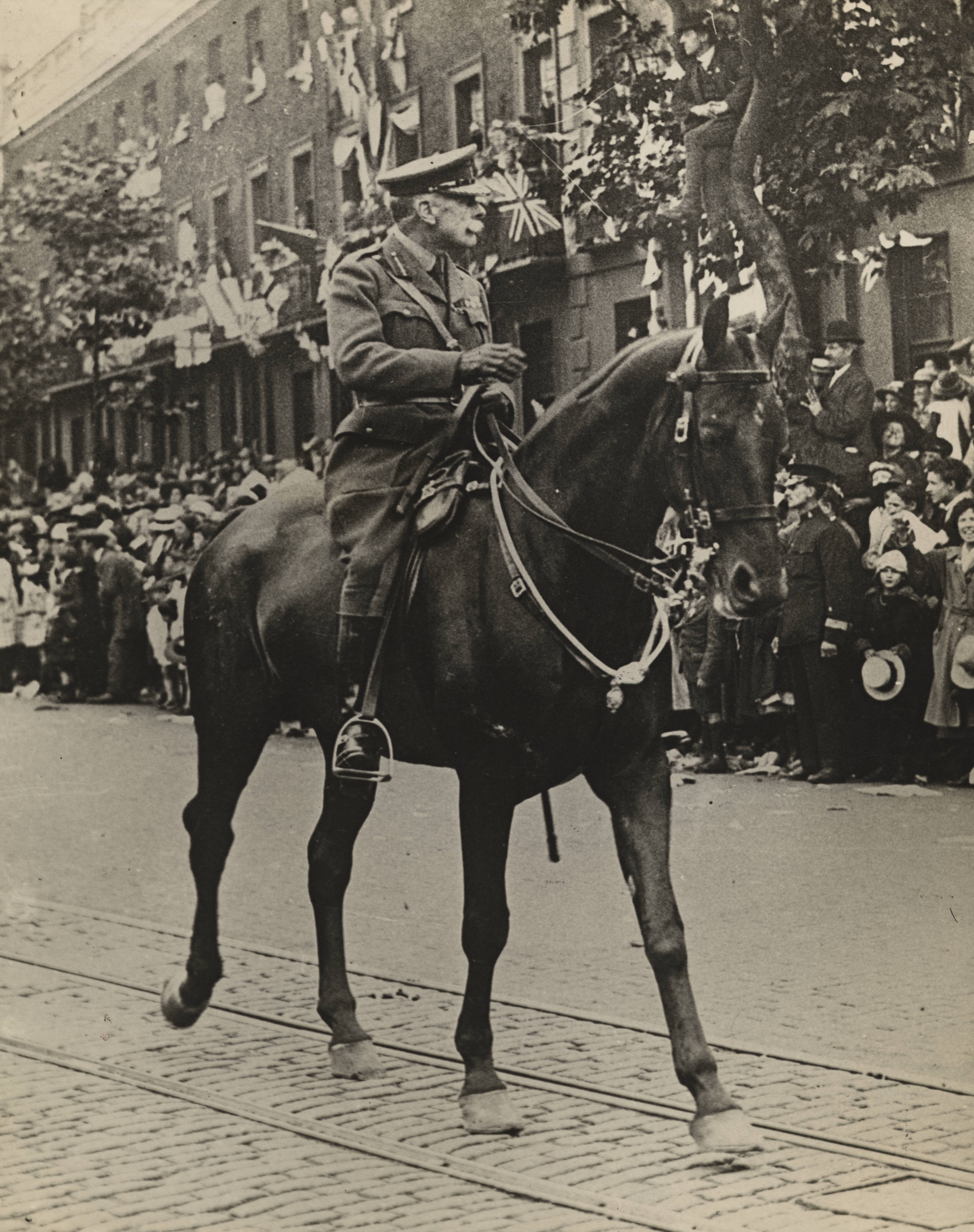
Field Marshal Haig during the London Victory Parade of 1919.

Lloyd George arranged a ceremonial reception for Marshal Foch on 1 December; Haig was asked to travel in the fifth carriage with Henry Wilson but not invited to the reception. Feeling that this was a snub and an attempt to win votes for the imminent election, Haig declined to attend at all. In November 1918 Haig refused Lloyd George's offer of a viscountcy, partly as he felt it was another snub, as his predecessor Sir John French had been awarded the same rank on being removed from command of the BEF, and partly to use his refusal to bargain for better state financial aid for demobilised soldiers. (Note: Following pressure from Haig, War Pensions Committees were eventually given statutory backing in 1921.) Haig held out despite being lobbied by the King, until Lloyd George backed down in March 1919, blaming a recently sacked pensions minister. Haig was created Earl Haig, Viscount Dawick and Baron Haig, of Bemersyde in the County of Berwick, received the thanks of both Houses of Parliament and a grant of £100,000.

In January 1919, disturbances broke out among troops at Calais, as men returning from leave were expected to return to full army discipline and key workers with jobs to go to (who had often been the last to enlist) were – contrary to Haig's advice – given priority for demobilisation. Haig accepted the advice of Winston Churchill that exercising his right to shoot the ringleaders was not sensible. For much of 1919, Haig served as Commander-in-Chief, Home Forces, a key position as a general strike seemed likely. Haig kept a low profile in this job and insisted the army be kept in reserve, not used for normal policing. His military career ended in January 1920. Lord Haig arranged for his Dispatches to be published in 1922 as the General Election loomed, although in the end his nemesis Lloyd George was ousted for unrelated reasons.

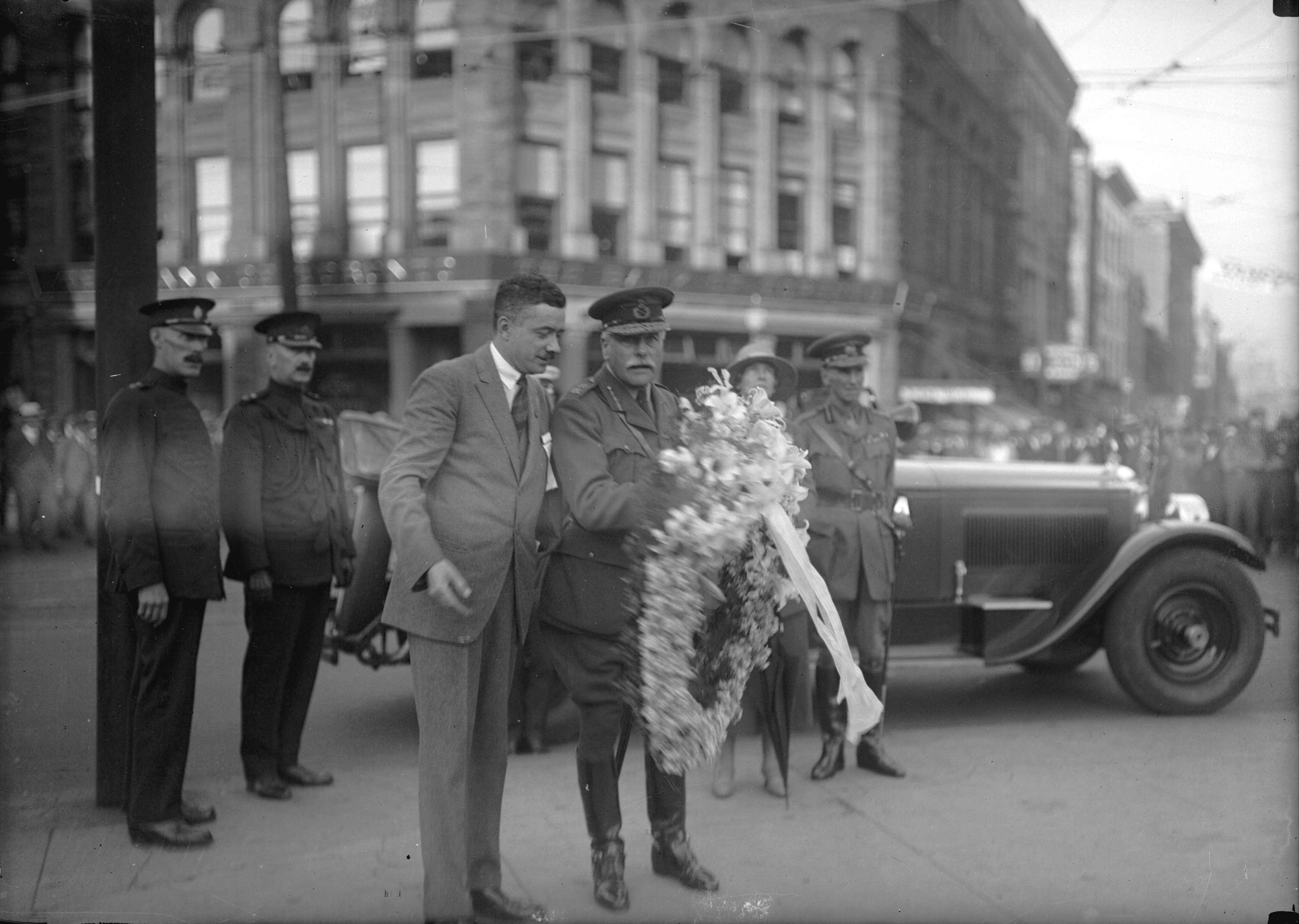
Haig in Vancouver, British Columbia

After retiring from the service, Lord Haig devoted the rest of his life to the welfare of ex-servicemen. Haig pushed for the amalgamation of organisations, quashing a suggestion of a separate organisation for officers, into the British Legion which was founded in June 1921. He visited South Africa in 1921, Newfoundland in 1924 to unveil the National War Memorial, and Canada in 1925 to promote ex-servicemen's interests. Visits to Australia and New Zealand were being planned when he died. He was instrumental in setting up the Haig Fund for the financial assistance of ex-servicemen and the Haig Homes charity to ensure they were properly housed.

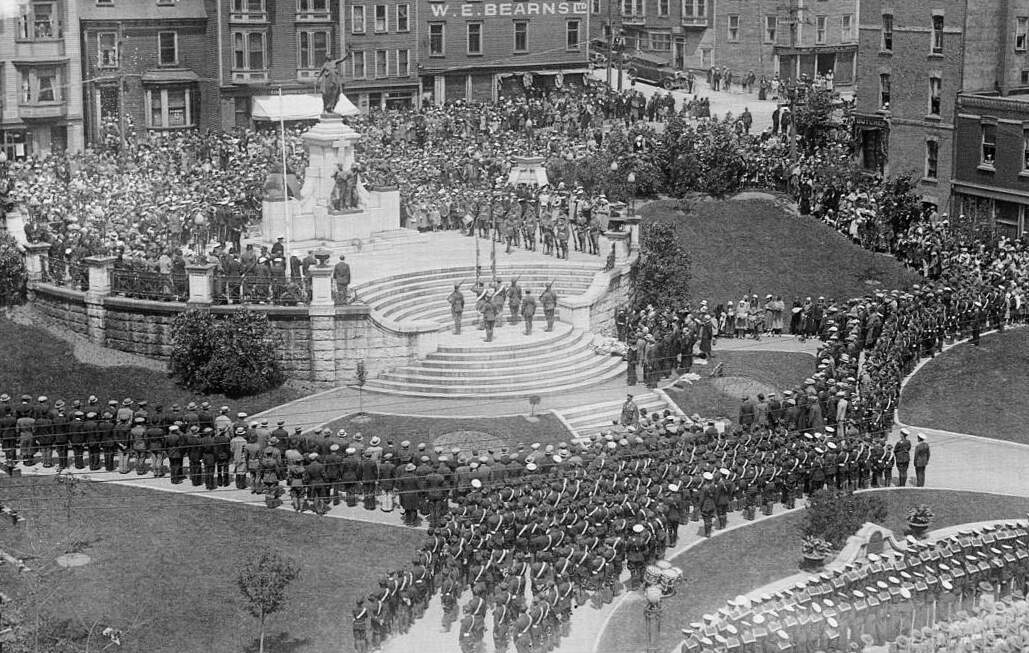
Haig unveiling the National War Memorial in St. John's, Newfoundland. (Memorial Day 1 July 1924).

An avid golf enthusiast, Haig was captain of The Royal and Ancient Golf Club of St Andrews, from 1920 to 1921. He was president of the British Legion, and was chairman of the United Services Fund from 1921. He held both duties until his death.

Haig maintained ties with the British Army after his retirement; he was honorary colonel of the 17th/21st Lancers (having been honorary colonel of the 17th Lancers from 1912), the London Scottish, the King's Own Scottish Borderers, and the Royal Horse Guards. He was elected the Lord Rector of the University of St Andrews to serve a term from 1916 to 1919. He returned to St Andrews in 1922 to serve as Chancellor of the University, a role he held until his death.

== Death ==
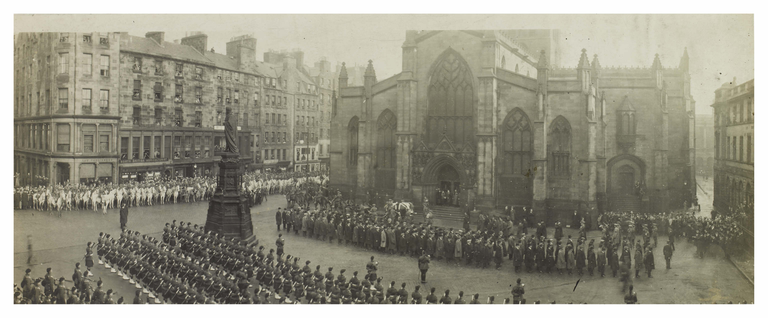
Funeral of Earl Haig, St Giles Kirk, Edinburgh, February 1928.

Haig died in London from a heart attack on 29 January 1928, and was given an elaborate funeral on 3 February. "Great crowds lined the streets ... come to do honour to the chief who had sent thousands to the last sacrifice when duty called for it, but whom his war-worn soldiers loved as their truest advocate and friend." The gun-carriage that had carried the Unknown Warrior to his grave in 1920 took Haig's body from St Columba's Church, where it had been lying in state, to Westminster Abbey. Three royal princes followed the gun-carriage and the pall-bearers included two Marshals of France (Foch and Pétain). The cortege was accompanied by five guards of honour, representing the Royal Navy, the Irish Guards, the Royal Air Force, the 1st French Army Corps, and the Belgian Regiment of Grenadiers. After the service at the Abbey, the procession re-formed to escort the body to Waterloo station for the journey to Edinburgh, where it lay in state for three days at St Giles' Cathedral.

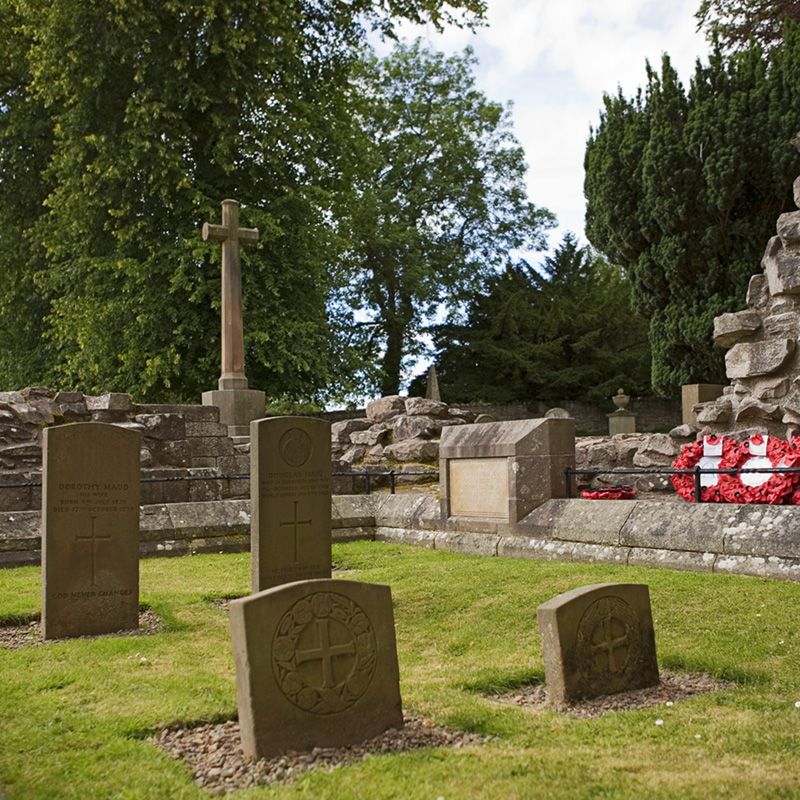
Douglas Haig's grave (right) next to his wife, with the standard military headstone used in the First World War.

Haig was buried at Dryburgh Abbey in the Scottish borders, the grave being marked with a plain stone tablet in the style of the standard headstones of the Imperial War Graves Commission issued to British military casualties in the First World War.

The Earl Haig Memorial, an equestrian statue in Whitehall commissioned by Parliament and sculpted by Alfred Frank Hardiman, aroused some controversy and was not unveiled until just before Armistice Day in 1937.

== Reputation ==
=== Post-war opinion ===
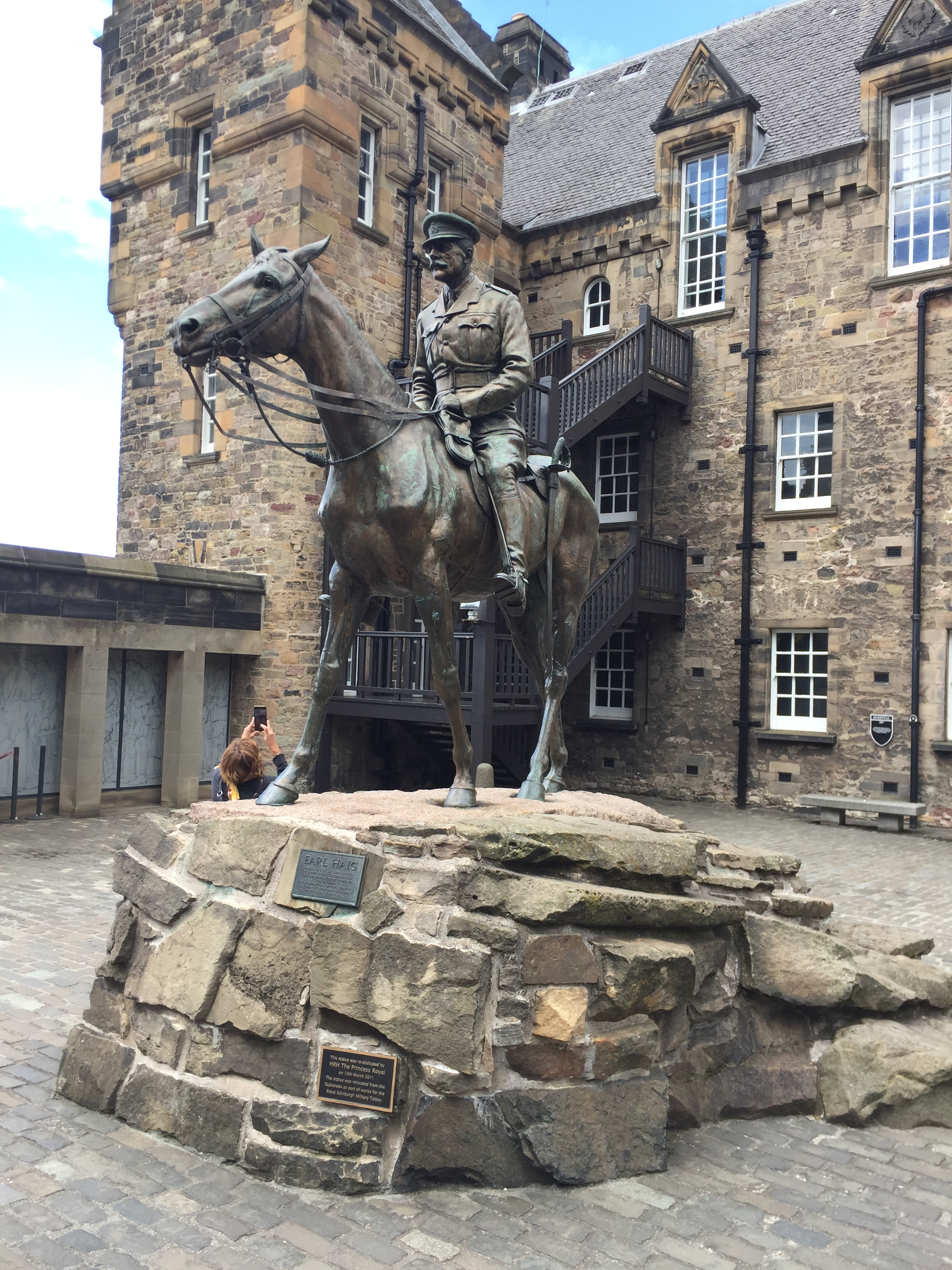
Earl Haig statue, Edinburgh Castle. The statue was commissioned by Sir Dhunjibhoy Bomanji of Bombay. It was in full view near the Castle entrance, but now relatively hidden in a back courtyard at the entrance to the National War Museum.

After the war Haig was praised by the American General John J. Pershing, who remarked that Haig was "the man who won the war". His funeral in 1928 was a huge state occasion. However, after his death he was increasingly criticised for issuing orders which led to excessive casualties of British troops under his command on the Western Front, earning him the nickname "Butcher of the Somme".

Winston Churchill, whose The World Crisis was written during Haig's lifetime, suggested that greater use of tanks, as at Cambrai, could have been an alternative to blocking enemy machine-gun fire with "the breasts of brave men". Churchill also wrote that although the Allied offensives up until August 1918 had been "as hopeless as they were disastrous", "Haig and Foch were vindicated in the end". Churchill admitted to Lord Beaverbrook that "subsequent study of the war has led me to think a good deal better of Haig than I did at the time. It is absolutely certain there was no one who could have taken his place." Churchill's essay on Haig in Great Contemporaries, written after Haig's death, was slightly more critical, noting the government's refusal to offer Haig employment after 1920, his emphasis on the Western Front and his lack of the "sinister genius" possessed by the truly great generals of history.

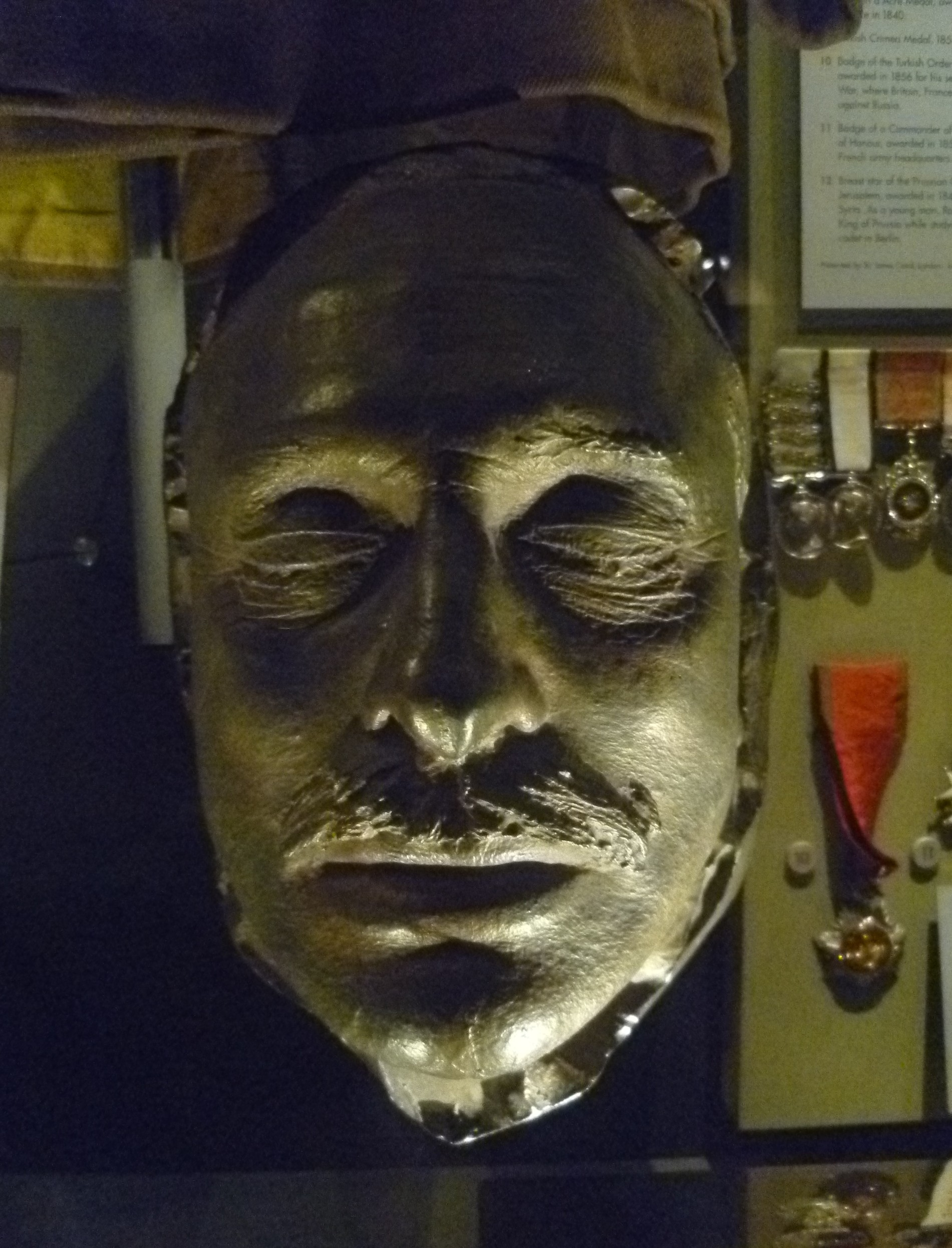
Haig's death mask, Edinburgh Castle

Lloyd George was more critical in his War Memoirs, published in 1936. He described Haig as "intellectually and temperamentally unequal to his task", although "above the average for his profession—perhaps more in industry than intelligence". Lloyd George's biographer John Grigg (2002) attributed his vitriol to a guilty conscience, that he had not intervened to stop the Passchendaele Offensive. John Terraine, writing of the "shrill venom" with which Lloyd George sought to "exculpate himself", called the memoirs "a document as shabby as his behaviour at Calais".

B. H. Liddell Hart, a military historian who had been wounded during the First World War, went from admirer to sceptic to unremitting critic. He wrote in his diary:

[Haig] was a man of supreme egoism and utter lack of scruple – who, to his overweening ambition, sacrificed hundreds of thousands of men. A man who betrayed even his most devoted assistants as well as the Government which he served. A man who gained his ends by trickery of a kind that was not merely immoral but criminal.

John Laffin, an Australian military historian who had served in the Second World War, commented unfavourably on Haig:

Haig and other British generals must be indicted not for incomprehension but for wilful blunders and wicked butchery. However stupid they might have been, however much they were the product of a system which obstructed enterprise, they knew what they were doing. There can never be forgiveness.

=== Other historians ===
One of Haig's defenders was the military historian John Terraine, who published a biography of Haig (The Educated Soldier) in 1963, in which Haig was portrayed as a "Great Captain" of the calibre of the Duke of Marlborough or the Duke of Wellington. Terraine, taking his cue from Haig's "Final Despatch" of 1918, argued that Haig pursued the only strategy possible given the situation. Gary Sheffield stated that although Terraine's arguments about Haig have been much attacked over forty years, Terraine's thesis "has yet to be demolished".

Australian historian Les Carlyon wrote that while Haig was slow to adapt to the correct use of artillery in sufficient quantities to support infantry attacks and was generally sceptical that such doctrine had much place in military theory, he was fully supportive of excellent corps and field commanders such as Herbert Plumer, Arthur Currie and John Monash, who seem to best grasp and exercise these concepts, especially later in the war. Carlyon also wrote that there was a case to answer, for his support of more dubious commanders such as Ian Hamilton, Aylmer Hunter-Weston and Hubert Gough.

==== Tactical developments ====
Critics, including Alan Clark and Gerard De Groot, argue that Haig failed to appreciate the critical science of artillery and that he was "unimaginative", although de Groot added that he has had the misfortune to be judged by the standards of a later age. Paul Fussell, a literary historian, wrote in The Great War and Modern Memory:

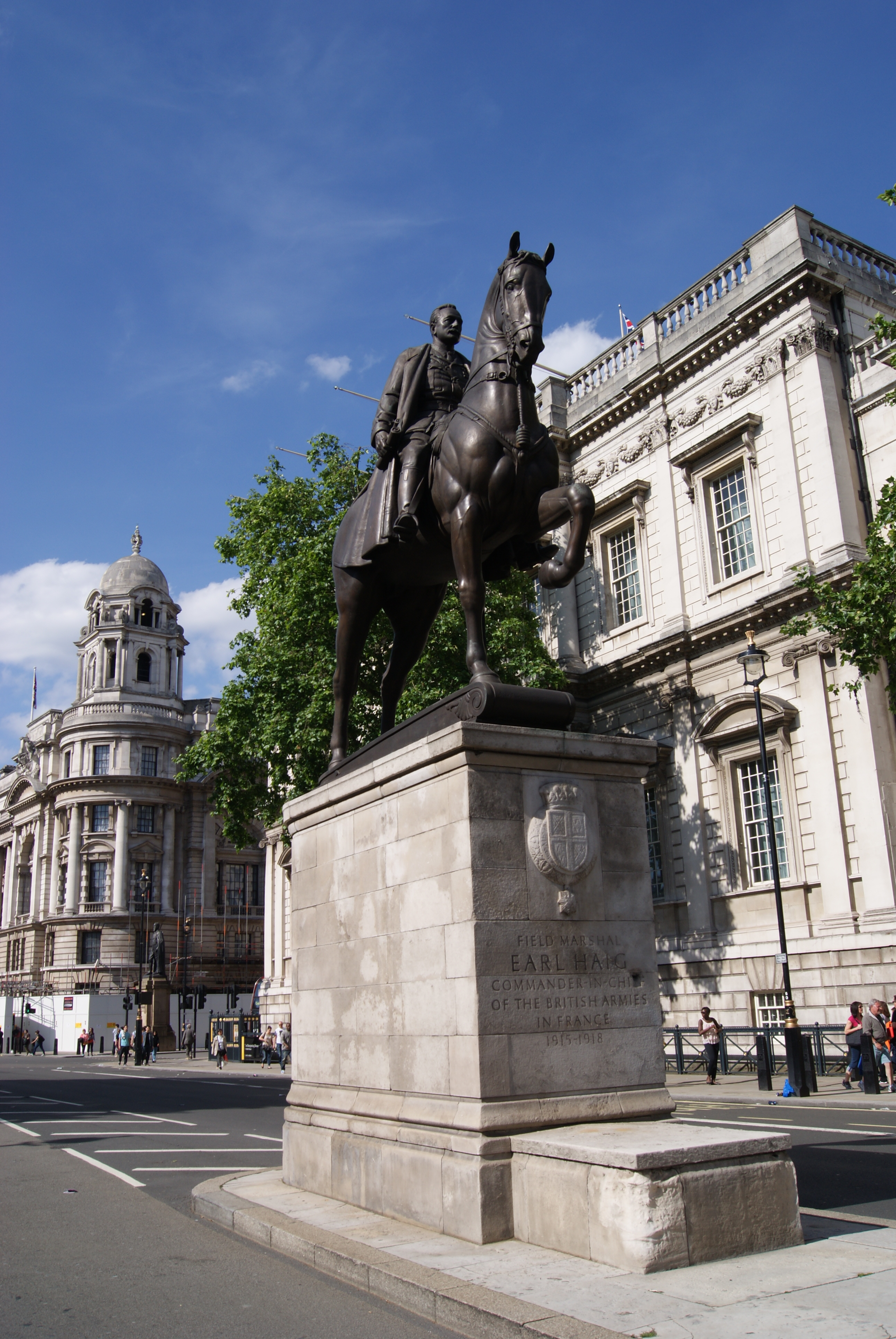
Earl Haig Memorial, Whitehall, London

although one doesn't want to be too hard on Haig ... who has been well calumniated already ... it must be said that it now appears that one thing the war was testing was the usefulness of the earnest Scottish character in a situation demanding the military equivalent of wit and invention. Haig had none. He was stubborn, self-righteous, inflexible, intolerant—especially of the French—and quite humourless ... Indeed, one powerful legacy of Haig's performance is the conviction among the imaginative and intelligent today of the unredeemable defectiveness of all civil and military leaders. Haig could be said to have established the paradigm.

Military historian John Bourne wrote that Haig, although not familiar with technological advances, encouraged their use. He also rejected claims that Haig was a traditionalist and focused only on cavalry tactics. Cavalry represented less than three per cent of the BEF in France by September 1916, whilst the British were the most mechanised force in the world by 1918, supported by the world's largest air force. The Tank Corps was the world's first such force and some 22,000 men served in it during the war. The Royal Artillery grew by 520 per cent and the engineers who implemented combined arms tactics grew by 2,212 per cent. Bourne wrote that this hardly demonstrates a lack of imagination. Other historians, notably John Keegan, refused to accept that the British Army underwent a "learning curve"; despite this example, Bourne wrote that there "is little disagreement among scholars about the nature of the military transformation". Popular "media opinion" had failed to grasp that under Haig, the British Army adopted a modern style of war in 1918.

There is no consensus on the speed of a learning curve. Tim Travers blamed the management of early campaigns on the ethos of the pre-war officer corps, which was based on privilege, with a hierarchy intent on self-preservation and maintaining individual reputations. As a consequence the army was poorly positioned to adapt quickly. Travers wrote that initiative was discouraged and that the ethos of the army was pro-human and anti-technological. The offensive spirit of the infantry, quality of the soldier, rapid rifle-fire and the idea of the soldier being the most important aspect of the battlefield prevailed. The lessons of the Russo-Japanese War and the power of artillery were ignored, which caused costly tactical mistakes in the first half of the war. The tactics that Haig pursued were beyond the mobility and range of artillery, which contributed to operational failures and heavy losses. Travers also criticised Haig and enemy commanders for seeing battle as perfectly organised and something that could be planned perfectly, ignoring the concept of fog of war. Travers wrote that top-down command became impossible in the chaos of battle. The lack of attention to lower levels of command in the early years of the war created a command vacuum.

Bourne considered this to be too harsh, arguing that Haig progressed along with other commanders of the Edwardian era in implementing advances in operational methods, technology and tactical doctrine. Bourne also wrote that it was difficult to reconcile the commanders of 1918 with the dogma-ridden, unprofessional, unreflecting institution depicted by Travers.

Biographers Robin Prior and Trevor Wilson in the Oxford Dictionary of National Biography state:

As a result of his determination to accomplish great victories Haig too often disregarded key factors such as weather, and the condition of the battlefield, placed his objectives beyond the range which his artillery could cover and incorporated in his schemes a role for cavalry which this arm was helpless to accomplish. These shortcomings, it needs to be stressed, were not at all peculiar to Haig. ... But the outcome, too often, was British operations directed towards unrealizable objectives and persisted in long after they had ceased to serve any worthwhile purpose. The consequence was excessive loss of British lives, insubstantial accomplishment, and waning morale.

==== Casualties ====
Haig has been criticised for the high casualties in British offensives, but historians like John Terraine argue that this was largely a function of the size of the battles, as British forces engaged the main body of the German Army on the Western Front after 1916. Although total deaths in the Second World War were far higher than in the First, British deaths were lower, because Britain fought mainly peripheral campaigns in the Mediterranean for much of the Second World War, involving relatively few British troops, while most of the land fighting took place between Germany and the Soviet Union. When British forces engaged in Normandy in 1944, total losses were fewer than on the Somme in 1916, as Normandy was around half the length and less than half the size but casualties per unit per week were broadly similar. David French wrote that British daily loss rates at Normandy, in which divisions lost up to three quarters of their infantry, were similar to those of Passchendaele in 1917, while average battalion casualty rates in 1944–45 (100 men per week) were similar to those of the First World War.

John Terraine wrote:

It is important, when we feel our emotions rightly swelling over the losses of 1914–18, to remember that in 1939–45 the world losses were probably over four times as many ... the British task was entirely different, which is why the (British) loss of life was so different: about 350,000 in 1939–45 and about 750,000 (British deaths, 1 million including the Empire) in 1914–18 ... – ... The casualty statistics of the Great War ... tell us ... virtually nothing about the quality of ... British generals. The statistics show that ... the British losses in great battles were generally about the same as anyone else's.

He also wrote that British perceptions were coloured by the terrible losses of 1 July 1916, during which the British Army sustained 57,000 casualties, but that it should also be remembered that the British never suffered anything like the losses of June 1916, when the Austro-Hungarian Army experienced 280,000 casualties in a week, or of August 1914, when the French Army lost 211,000 men in 16 days, or of March and April 1918, when the Germans lost nearly 350,000 men in six weeks, or 1915, when Russia suffered 2 million casualties in a year.

Total British First World War deaths seemed especially severe as they fell among certain groups such as Pals Battalions (volunteers who enlisted together and were allowed to serve together) or the alleged "Lost Generation" of public school and university-educated junior officers. British deaths, although heavy compared to other British wars, were only around half those of France or Germany relative to population.

==== Alleged falsification of records ====
Denis Winter wrote that Haig protected his reputation by falsifying his diary to mislead historians. Barring a few disputes over contentious meetings, such as the War Council of early August 1914 and the Doullens Conference of March 1918, "the overall authenticity of Haig's diary is, however, not in doubt", not least because of the frequency with which its contents have been used to criticise him. John Bourne wrote that "Winter's perceived conspiracy would appear to be one of the least successful in history. The falsification of his diary seems equally inept, given the frequency with which its contents are held against the author's competence, integrity and humanity, not least by Winter himself."

Winter wrote that Haig and the British Government had conspired with the Official Historian, Brigadier James Edward Edmonds, to show Haig in a better light in the Official History of the Great War. These claims were rejected by a number of historians, including Robin Prior and Correlli Barnett. Barnett's comments were supported by John Hussey and Jeffrey Grey of the University of New South Wales, who wrote that:

A check of the documents cited in the Heyes papers, collected for [the Australian Official Historian] C. E. W. Bean in London in the 1920s, and in the correspondence between Bean and the British Official Historian, Sir James Edmonds, not only fails to substantiate Winter's claims but reinforces still further Barnett's criticisms of (Winter's) capacity as a researcher ... includ(ing) ... misidentification of documents, misquotation of documents, the running together of passages from different documents ... and misdating of material..(including) misdat(ing) a letter by seventeen years ... to support his conspiracy case against Edmonds.

Donald Cameron Watt found Winter

curiously ignorant of the by-no-means secret grounds on which the Cabinet Office, or rather its secretary, Lord Hankey, initiated a series of official histories of the first world war and the terms which were binding on the authors commissioned to write them.

Winter wrote that Edmonds did not canvass the opinion of veterans, which was untrue – some volumes were sent to 1,000 or more officers for their comments, as well as being checked against unit diaries down to battalion level – in some cases entire chapters were rewritten (or in the case of Passchendaele, the volume was rewritten several times in the 1940s, during disputes about the roles of Haig and Hubert Gough, who was still alive). Winter quoted, out of context, Edmonds' advice to his researchers to write a draft narrative first, then invite interviewees to comment over lunch: Andrew Green, in his study of the Official History, wrote that this was done deliberately, for memories to be jogged by the draft narrative and that senior officers were more likely to be frank if approached informally.

== In popular culture ==
Haig appeared as himself in the films Under Four Flags (1918) and Remembrance (1927).

Haig has commonly been portrayed as an inept commander who exhibited callous disregard for the lives of his soldiers. Sometimes the criticism is more against the generation of British generals which he is deemed to represent, a view aired by writers such as John Laffin (British Butchers and Bunglers of World War One) and John Mosier (Myth of the Great War). Alan Clark's book The Donkeys (1961) led to the popularisation of the phrase 'lions led by donkeys' to describe British generalship. A critical biographer finds "no evidence of widespread contempt for Haig".

In the Joan Littlewood musical Oh, What a Lovely War! which was opposed by the Haig family, he was portrayed by George Sewell. Haig was played by John Mills in the film version, in which much of the dialogue is taken from The Donkeys. He is portrayed as being indifferent to the fate of the troops under his command.

In the 1989 BBC comedy series Blackadder Goes Forth, Haig, played by Geoffrey Palmer, appears in the final episode. Referring to the limited gains made during the 1915–1917 offensives, Blackadder says: "Haig is about to make yet another gargantuan effort to move his drinks cabinet six inches closer to Berlin".

== Honours ==
Country	Date	Appointment	Ribbon	Post-nominal letters	Notes
British honours
United Kingdom	27 September 1901	Companion of the Order of the Bath		CB	Promoted to KCB in 1913
United Kingdom	1904	Commander of the Royal Victorian Order		CVO	Promoted to KCVO in 1909
United Kingdom	25 June 1909	Knight Commander of the Royal Victorian Order		KCVO	Promoted to GCVO in 1916
United Kingdom	December 1911	Delhi Durbar Medal (Silver)			
United Kingdom	12 December 1911	Knight Commander of the Order of the Indian Empire		KCIE	
United Kingdom	3 June 1913	Knight Commander of the Order of the Bath		KCB	Promoted to GCB in 1915
United Kingdom	3 June 1915	Knight Grand Cross of the Order of the Bath		GCB	
United Kingdom	15 August 1916	Knight Grand Cross of the Royal Victorian Order		GCVO	
United Kingdom	31 July 1917	Knight of the Order of the Thistle		KT	
United Kingdom	3 June 1919	Member of the Order of Merit		OM	
United Kingdom		Queen's Sudan Medal			
United Kingdom		Queen's South Africa Medal			clasps: Paardeberg, Driefontein, Johannesburg, Diamond Hill, Belfast, Relief of Kimberley, Elandslaagte
United Kingdom		King's South Africa Medal			clasps: South Africa 1901, South Africa 1902
United Kingdom		1914 Star and clasp			
United Kingdom		British War Medal			
United Kingdom		World War I Victory Medal			
Foreign honours
Khedivate of Egypt	1898	Khedive's Sudan Medal			with clasps: The Atbara, Khartoum
France	15 May 1915	Grand Officer of the Legion of Honour			Promoted to Grand Cross in 1916
France	24 February 1916	Grand Cross of the Legion of Honour			
Belgium	24 February 1916	Grand Cordon of the Order of Leopold			
Kingdom of Italy	14 September 1916	Knight Grand Cross of the Order of Saints Maurice and Lazarus			
Kingdom of Montenegro	31 October 1916	1st Class of the Order of Prince Danilo I			
Kingdom of Montenegro	31 October 1916	Obilić Medal in Gold			
France	21 April 1917	Croix de Guerre			
Russian Empire	1 June 1917	4th Class of the Order of St George			
Belgium	11 March 1918	Croix de guerre			
Kingdom of Serbia	10 September 1918	Knight Grand Cross of the Order of the Karađorđe's Star with Swords			Military division
Empire of Japan	9 November 1918	Grand Cordon with Paulownia Flowers of the Order of the Rising Sun			
Kingdom of Siam	16 November 1918	Knight Grand Commander of the Order of Rama			
United States	1918	Army Distinguished Service Medal			
Kingdom of Romania	20 September 1919	1st Class of the Order of Michael the Brave			

=== Arms ===
Coat of arms of Douglas Haig, 1st Earl Haig
Crest A rock proper. Escutcheon "1st and 4th azure, a saltire between two mullets in chief and base and a decrescent and increscent in fesse argent, a bordure parted per pale argent and sable charged with three cows' heads cabossed all counterchanged (Haig), 2nd and 3rd argent, three cows' heads cabossed sable within a bordure engrailed azure, (Veitch of Stewartfield)." Supporters "Dexter, a bay horse caparisoned, thereon mounted a Private of the 7th (Queen's Own) Hussars, habited, armed and accoutred; sinister, a bay horse, caparisoned, thereon mounted a Lancer of the 17th (Duke of Cambridge's Own) Lancers, habited, armed and accoutred; all proper." Motto Tyde What May

== Honorary degrees ==
Date	School	Degree
1919	University of Edinburgh	Doctor of Laws (LLD)
11 July 1919	University of Aberdeen	
8 May 1919	University of Glasgow	Doctor of Laws (LLD)
25 June 1919	University of Oxford	Doctor of Civil Law (DCL)
1920	University of Leeds	Doctor of Laws (LLD)

=== Freedom of the City ===
- 26 January 1912: Bradford
- 15 May 1919: Dundee
- 16 June 1919: London
- 25 June 1919: Oxford
- 16 October 1919: Wolverhampton
- 23 January 1920: Leeds
- 14 October 1922: Stirling
- Unknown: Glasgow

== Legacy ==
The Argentine football club Club Atlético Douglas Haig, founded 1918, is named after Haig.

In 1920, the Great Central Railway gave the name Earl Haig to one of their new express passenger locomotives. It carried the name until 1943.

Earl Haig Secondary School in Toronto was named after Haig. A species of cottage tulip, "Marshal Haig", is named after him. The Hundred of Haig, a cadastral unit in South Australia, was named after Haig in 1918. In the early 1920s, several years before his death, a new road of council houses in Kates Hill was named Haig Road. Other roads named in honour of Haig include Haig Avenue in Southport (and the football ground of Southport F.C. that was situated there); Haig Avenue in Mount Roskill, Auckland; Haig Road in Singapore; and General Haig Street in New Orleans.

== Sources ==
- Boddy, M. G.; Brown, W. A.; Fry, E. V.; Hennigan, W.; Hoole, Ken; Manners, F.; Neve, E.; Platt, E. N. T.; Proud, P.; Yeadon, W. B. (March 1975). Locomotives of the L.N.E.R: Tender Engines – Classes B1 to B19. part 2B. Lincoln: Railway Correspondence & Travel Society. ISBN 0-901115-73-8. OCLC 655688865.
- Boddy, M. G.; Fry, E. V.; Hennigan, W.; Proud, P.; Yeadon, W. B. (July 1963). Fry, E. V. (ed.). Locomotives of the L.N.E.R: Preliminary Survey. part 1. Potters Bar: Railway Correspondence & Travel Society. OCLC 505163991.
- Bond, Brian (2002). The Unquiet Western Front. Cambridge University Press. ISBN 978-0521809955.
- Bond, Brian; Cave, Nigel (2009). Haig – A Reappraisal 70 Years On. Pen & Sword. ISBN 978-0850526981.
- Bullock, Arthur (2009). Gloucestershire Between the Wars: A Memoir. The History Press. ISBN 978-0-7524-4793-3.
- Carlyon, Les (2005). The Great War. Pan MacMillan. ISBN 978-1405037617.
- Charteris, Brigadier-General John (1929). Field Marshal Earl Haig. Cassell. OCLC 1683342.
- Churchill, Winston (1937). Great Contemporaries. Butterworths. ISBN 978-1935191995.
- Churchill, Winston (1938). The World Crisis. Odhams. ISBN 978-0141442051.
- Cohen, Deborah (2001). The War Come Home: Disabled Veterans in Britain and Germany, 1914–1939. University of California Press. ISBN 978-0520220089.
- Corrigan, Gordon (2002). Mud, Blood & Poppycock. Cassell. ISBN 978-0304366590.
- Davidson, Major General Sir J. (2010). Haig, Master of the Field. Barnsley: Pen & Sword. ISBN 978-1848843622.
- De Groot, Gerard (1988). Douglas Haig 1861–1928. London: Unwin Hyman. ISBN 978-0044401926.
- Duffy, C. (2007). Through German Eyes, The British and the Somme 1916. Phoenix Books. ISBN 978-0-7538-2202-9.
- French, David (2000). Raising Churchill's Army. London: Oxford University Press. ISBN 978-0199246304.
- Gollin, Alfred (1964). Proconsul in Politics: Lord Milner. Macmillan. OCLC 175027.
- Green, Andrew (2003). Writing the Great War. London: Frank Cass. ISBN 978-0714684307.
- Haig, Countess (1936). The Man I Knew. The Moray Press. OCLC 752595381.
- Haig, F–M Sir Douglas (1919). Lt.-Col. J. H. Boraston (ed.). Sir Douglas Haig's Despatches (December 1915 – April 1919). Dent. OCLC 479257.
- Hart, Peter (2008). 1918: A Very British Victory. Phoenix Books. ISBN 978-0-7538-2689-8.
- Heathcote, Tony (1999). The British Field Marshals 1736–1997. Barnsley (UK): Pen & Sword. ISBN 0-85052-696-5.
- Hoare, Philip (1995). Noel Coward: a biography. Sinclair-Stevenson. ISBN 978-1856192651.
- Mead, Gary (2008). The Good Soldier: The Biography of Douglas Haig. Atlantic Books. ISBN 978-1-84354-281-0.
- Mosley, Charles (2003). Burke's Peerage, Baronetage & Knightage. Vol. 2 (107 ed.). Burke's Peerage (Genealogical Books). ISBN 978-0971196629.
- Laffin, John (1988). British Butchers and Bunglers of World War One. Stroud, Gloucs: Sutton. ISBN 978-0-7509-0179-6.
- Liddell Hart, B.H. (1930). The Real War. Little, Brown, and Company. ISBN 978-0-316-52505-3.
- Neillands, Robin (2006). The Death of Glory: the Western Front 1915. London: John Murray. ISBN 978-0-7195-6245-7.
- Prior, Robin; Wilson, Trevor. Haig, Douglas, first Earl Haig (1861–1928) (Oxford University Press, 2004; (online edn) January 2011 ed.). London: Oxford Dictionary of National Biography.
- Reid, Walter (2006). Architect of Victory: Douglas Haig. Birlinn. ISBN 978-1841585178.
- Rowlands, Murray (2015). Aldershot in the Great War: The Home of the British Army. Pen & Sword Military. ISBN 978-1783832026.
- Russell, John (1881). The Haigs of Bemersyde: A Family History. W. Blackwood & Sons.
- Secrett, Sergeant T. (1929). Twenty-Five Years with Earl Haig. Jarrods. OCLC 758825316.
- Sheffield, Gary (2002). Forgotten Victory: The First World War: Myths and Realities. Headline Review. ISBN 978-0747264606.
- Sheffield, Gary; Bourne, John (2005). Douglas Haig War Diaries and Letters 1914–18. Phoenix. ISBN 978-0297847021.
- Sheffield, Gary (2011). The Chief: Douglas Haig and the British Army. London: Aurum. ISBN 978-1-84513-691-8.
- Sheffield, Gary, ed. (2019). In Haig's Shadow: The Letters of Major General Hugo de Pree and Field Marshal Sir Douglas Haig. Barnsley: Greenhill Books. ISBN 978-1-78438-353-4.
- Terraine, John (1963). Douglas Haig: The Educated Soldier. Hutchinson. ISBN 978-0304353194.
- Terraine, John (1977). The Road to Passchendaele: The Flanders Offensive of 1917: A Study in Inevitability. Leo Cooper. ISBN 978-0850522297.
- Terraine, J. (1992) [1980]. The Smoke and the Fire, Myths and Anti-myths of War 1861–1945 (Leo Cooper ed.). London: Sidgwick & Jackson. ISBN 0-85052-330-3.
- Todman, Dan (2005). The Great War: Myth and Memory. Hambledon Continuum. ISBN 978-1852855123.
- Travers, Tim (1992). How the War Was Won. Routledge. ISBN 978-1-84415-207-0.
- Winter, Denis (1991). Haig's Command. Viking. ISBN 978-1844152049.

Military offices
Preceded by Sir Beauchamp Duff	Chief of the General Staff (India); 1909–1912	Succeeded by Sir Percy Lake
Preceded by Sir Horace Smith-Dorrien	General Officer Commanding-in-Chief Aldershot Command; 1912–1914	Succeeded by Sir Alexander Hamilton-Gordon
New command	General Officer Commanding I Corps; August – December 1914	Succeeded by Charles Monro
New command	General Officer Commanding First Army; 1914–1915	Succeeded by Sir Henry Rawlinson
Preceded by Sir John French	Commander-in-Chief British Expeditionary Force; 1915–1919	Succeeded by Sir John Asser (as GOC British Troops in France and Flanders)
Honorary titles
Preceded by Thomas Arthur Cooke	Colonel of the 17th Lancers (Duke of Cambridge's Own); 1912–1922	Regiment amalgamated
Preceded by Sir Evelyn Wood	Colonel of the Royal Horse Guards; 1919–1928	Succeeded by Sir William Robertson
New title Regiment formed	Colonel of the 17th/21st Lancers; 1922–1926; With: Sir Herbert Lawrence	Succeeded by Sir Herbert Lawrence
Preceded by Sir Charles Woollcombe	Colonel of the King's Own Scottish Borderers; 1923–1928	Succeeded by Duncan Alwyn Macfarlane
Academic offices
Preceded by The Marquess of Aberdeen and Temair	Rector of the University of St Andrews; 1916–1919	Succeeded by Sir J. M. Barrie
Preceded by The Lord Balfour of Burleigh	Chancellor of the University of St Andrews; 1922–1928	Succeeded by The Viscount Haldane
Peerage of the United Kingdom
New creation	Earl Haig; 1919–1928	Succeeded by George Haig
