= List of Regiments of Cavalry of the British Army =

This is a list of numbered Regiments of Cavalry of the British Army from the mid-18th century until 1922 when various amalgamations were implemented. The Life Guards were formed following the end of the English Civil War as troops of Life Guards between 1658 and 1659. Regiments were subsequently raised as part of the response to (i) the Monmouth Rebellion in 1685 (ii) the Jacobite rising in 1715 (iii) the Seven Years' War in 1759 and (iv) the Indian Rebellion in 1858.

The designation "dragoon guards" was introduced in 1746 to recognise the importance of some of the most senior regiments, who rode large strong horses, without actually increasing their pay. The more junior regiments, who rode lighter horses, were designated "dragoons" at that time, although some of them were subsequently re-designated "lancers" or "hussars".

The full list is as follows:

Household cavalry:

Number	Title	Formed	Fate	Successor 2018
1	1st Regiment of Life Guards	1658 (as troops of life guards)	1922: Life Guards	Life Guards
2	2nd Regiment of Life Guards	1659 (as troops of life guards)	1922: Life Guards	Life Guards
3	Royal Horse Guards	1661 (reformed on the Royal establishment)	1969: Blues and Royals	Blues and Royals

Heavy cavalry

Number	Title	Formed	Fate	Successor 2018
1	1st King's Dragoon Guards	1685	1959: 1st The Queen's Dragoon Guards	1st The Queen's Dragoon Guards
2	2nd Dragoon Guards (Queen's Bays)	1685	1959: 1st The Queen's Dragoon Guards	1st The Queen's Dragoon Guards
3	3rd (Prince Of Wales's) Dragoon Guards	1685	1922: 3rd/6th Dragoon Guards	Royal Scots Dragoon Guards
4	4th (Royal Irish) Dragoon Guards	1685	1922: 4th/7th Dragoon Guards	Royal Dragoon Guards
5	5th (Princess Charlotte of Wales's) Dragoon Guards	1685	1922: 5th/6th Dragoons	Royal Dragoon Guards
6	6th Dragoon Guards (Carabiniers)	1685	1922: 3rd/6th Dragoon Guards	Royal Scots Dragoon Guards
7	7th (Princess Royal's) Dragoon Guards	1688	1922: 4th/7th Dragoon Guards	Royal Dragoon Guards

Light cavalry:

Number	Title	Formed	Fate	Successor 2018
1	1st The Royal Dragoons	1661	1969: Blues and Royals	Blues and Royals
2	2nd Dragoons (Royal Scots Greys)	1678	1971: Royal Scots Dragoon Guards	Royal Scots Dragoon Guards
3	3rd (The King's Own) Hussars	1685	1958: Queen's Own Hussars	Queen's Royal Hussars
4	4th (Queen's Own) Hussars	1685	1958: Queen's Royal Irish Hussars	Queen's Royal Hussars
5	5th (Royal Irish) Lancers	1689 (Note: disbanded in 1799; reformed in 1858)	1922: 16th/5th The Queen's Royal Lancers	Royal Lancers
6	6th (Inniskilling) Dragoons	1689	1922: 5th/6th Dragoons	Royal Dragoon Guards
7	7th (Queen's Own) Hussars	1689	1958: Queen's Own Hussars	Queen's Royal Hussars
8	8th (King's Royal Irish) Hussars	1693	1958: Queen's Royal Irish Hussars	Queen's Royal Hussars
9	9th (Queen's Royal) Lancers	1715	1960: 9th/12th Royal Lancers	Royal Lancers
10	10th (Prince Of Wales's Own Royal) Hussars	1715	1969: Royal Hussars	King's Royal Hussars
11	11th (Prince Albert's Own) Hussars	1715	1969: Royal Hussars	King's Royal Hussars
12	12th (Prince Of Wales's Royal) Lancers	1715	1960: 9th/12th Royal Lancers	Royal Lancers
13	13th Hussars	1715	1922: 13th/18th Royal Hussars	Light Dragoons
14	14th (King's) Hussars	1715	1922: 14th/20th King's Hussars	King's Royal Hussars
15	15th (The King's) Hussars	1759	1922: 15th/19th The King's Royal Hussars	Light Dragoons
16	16th (Queen's) Lancers	1759	1922: 16th/5th Lancers	Royal Lancers
17	17th (Duke Of Cambridge's Own) Lancers	1759	1922: 17th/21st Lancers	Royal Lancers
18	18th (Queen Mary's Own) Hussars	1759 (Note: disbanded in 1821; reformed in 1858)	1922: 13th/18th Royal Hussars	Light Dragoons
19	19th (Queen Alexandra's Own Royal) Hussars	1858	1922: 15th/19th The King's Royal Hussars	Light Dragoons
20	20th Hussars	1858	1922: 14th/20th King's Hussars	King's Royal Hussars
21	21st (Empress of India's) Lancers	1858	1922: 17th/21st Lancers	Royal Lancers
