= Lancers in Italy during the Second World War =

The Lancers in Italy during the Second World War' is a brief combat history of the British Queen's Royal Lancers during the Italian campaign

In May 1943, after the successful North African campaign, the 16th/5th The Queen's Royal Lancers and the 17th/21st Lancers, as part of the 26th Armoured Brigade of the 6th Armoured Division, moved to Italy.

== History ==
=== 16th/5th Lancer regiment ===
The 16th/5th Lancers landed in Italy as part of Operation Avalanche, advancing to Naples, beginning their 16 month campaign in Italy. Unlike the open desert they had adapted to fight in, Italy was not ideal for armoured warfare, with mountainous terrain and many small vineyards and fields. They distinguished themselves in combat, fighting at Cassino, fighting as dismounted infantry in the Apennine mountains outside Florence in the winter of 1944/45, and the regiment distinguished itself at Piuarola, playing a major part for the Liberation of Rome.

Both regiments found it difficult terrain for tanks and armoured vehicles. At times, the Lancers had to revert to an infantry role.

=== 17th/21st Lancer regiment ===
The 17th/21st Lancers arrived in Italy during the phase when the allies were preparing for the assault on the Gustav line, Operation Diadem, which would open the route to capturing Rome. On 18 April 1945 both Lancer regiments broke out of Argenta, with the 17/21st Lancers passing through the 16/5th Lancers and capturing a bridge at Segni, seven miles ahead. They found the bridge blown and had to find an alternative route. They located a bridge intact at Gallo and were told to push onto Poggio Renatico. The assault began with a crossing of the River Gari, with the 17/21st moving to their crossing point over the river. The bridges that were supposed to be laid hadn't been, as the engineer's bulldozers had all been knocked out. The regiment improvised a bridge by using tanks to move a Bailey Bridge into position, allowing them to cross the river. Crossings from other units in XIII corps forced the Germans to withdraw from the Gustav line, and they retreated to the Hitler line.

After Rome had been captured, the advance northwards was even more difficult than before. There were limited routes that the armoured formations could use, and the Germans covered all of them. The delaying fight of the Germans was so effective that it took the allies 4 months to reach the Gothic line. During the winter of 1944/45, troops of the regiment were forced to fight as infantry in the Apennine mountains, manning trenches and using machine guns and mortars.

The final offensive of the war that the regiment took part in was the Battle of the Po Valley. On 2 May the Germans surrendered to the Allies, ending the Italy campaign.
