= Patrick Marriott =

British Army general (born 1958)

Major General Patrick Marriott CB CBE DL
- Born: 23 February 1958 (age 68)
- Military career
- Allegiance: United Kingdom
- Branch: British Army
- Service years: 1977–2012
- Rank: Major General
- Service number: 503872
- Commands: Royal Military Academy Sandhurst; 7th Armoured Brigade; Queen's Royal Lancers
- Conflicts: Iraq War
- Awards: Companion of the Order of the Bath; Commander of the Order of the British Empire; Queen's Commendation for Valuable Service

Major General Patrick Claude Marriott, CB, CBE, DL (born 23 February 1958) is a former British Army officer who became Commandant of the Royal Military Academy Sandhurst.

His early career was with the 17th/21st Lancers and the Queen's Royal Lancers, which he commanded for two years. Postings include the Multinational Force in Sinai, Northern Ireland, West Germany, Supreme Headquarters Allied Powers Europe, and two years in command of the 7th Armoured Brigade, including six months in Iraq.

On 1 August 2022 he was appointed Lord Lieutenant of Sutherland.

== Early life ==
The son of Captain Peter Barnsley Marriott DSO, DSC, RN (1915–1989), by his marriage to Francis Jill Davis, a former Leading Wren (died 2009), Marriott was educated at Granville School, Sevenoaks; Claremont School, Sussex; Gresham's School, (Farfield House), Holt, and at Sandhurst.

== Career ==
=== Military ===
After Sandhurst, Marriott was commissioned as a regular officer in May 1977, joining the 17th/21st Lancers. During 1982 he was a company commander in the Multinational Force and Observers in Sinai, returning to his regiment as Adjutant later that year. In 1985 he was posted as an assistant to the Vice Chief of the Defence Staff (Personnel & Logistics), in 1987 returned to the 17th/21st Lancers as a squadron leader, then in 1990 attended the Canadian Staff College in Toronto. He was an instructor at the Staff College from 1991, before service with the Queen's Royal Lancers in 1993 and taking up an appointment at the British Army Training Unit Suffield in 1995. This was followed by a brief posting to SHAPE in 1998. Later that year he became Commanding Officer of the Queen's Royal Lancers, after which he was Chief of Staff, HQ 1 (UK) Armoured Division from 2000. He took the Higher Command and Staff Course in 2004, then commanded 7th Armoured Brigade from 2005 to 2007, when he was appointed as Assistant Chief of Staff (Operations) at Permanent Joint Headquarters. He was Commandant of the Royal Military Academy Sandhurst from 2009 to 2012.

While serving in post-invasion Iraq as commander of the 7th Armoured Brigade, Marriott was also in command of all British troops in southern Iraq from 2005 to 2006. While many soldiers were complaining about the politicians who had sent them into action without enough men or equipment, Marriott took the view that the British could never have gained the trust of the people of Basra, thanks to their history. In an interview with the journalist Oliver Poole he said "The people were immersed in cruelty. There's a sad culture of mistrust, especially of authority." In celebration of his Brigade's nickname, "the Desert Rats", Marriott kept a large silver rat on his desk in Basra.

In 2012 he was appointed as Colonel of the Queen's Royal Lancers, retiring on 2 May 2015, when the regiment amalgamated with the 9th/12th Royal Lancers (Prince of Wales's) to form the Royal Lancers.

He was appointed Honorary Colonel of the 7th Battalion The Regiment of Scotland Army Reserve on 2 December 2024.

=== Ecclesiastical ===
Marriott served as a member of the House of Laity of the General Synod of the Church of England from 2005 to 2012, and was a director of the British Forces Foundation from 2009 to 2012.

=== Historian ===
Marriott authored a history of the Battle of Littleferry 1746 which was published in 2022.

== Private life ==
In 1989, Marriott married Karin Henrietta Warde Ingram, and they have two sons and one daughter.

In 2005, he was granted a coat of arms by the College of Arms. In 2013, soon after Marriott's retirement from the army, the Lord Lieutenant of Sutherland appointed him as a Deputy Lieutenant for the county of Sutherland.

On 1 August 2022 he was appointed Lord Lieutenant of Sutherland.

== Honours ==
- Officer of the Order of the British Empire, April 2000, "in recognition of gallant and distinguished services in the former Yugoslavia during 1999"
- Commander of the Order of the British Empire, 2003
- Queen's Commendation for Valuable Service, 2006
- Companion of the Order of the Bath (Military Division), in 2012 New Year Honours
- Deputy Lieutenant for the County of Sutherland, 18 September 2013

Military offices
| Preceded by David Rutherford-Jones | Commandant of the Royal Military Academy Sandhurst; 2009–2012 | Succeeded by Timothy Evans |
