= Royal Lancers =

Cavalry regiment of the British Army

The Royal Lancers (Queen Elizabeths' Own)
- Badge of the regiment
- Active: 2 May 2015 – present
- Country: United Kingdom
- Branch: British Army
- Type: Armoured cavalry
- Role: Reconnaissance
- Size: One regiment with four squadrons
- Part of: Royal Armoured Corps
- Garrison/HQ: RHQ – Prince William of Gloucester Barracks; Regiment – Catterick
- Nickname: The Death or Glory Boys
- Motto: Death or Glory
- March: Quick: Wellington; Slow: Coburg

Commanders
- Colonel-in-Chief: Queen Camilla
- Colonel of the Regiment: General Sir James Everard
- Commanding Officer: Lt Col Andrew Horsfall

Insignia
- Tactical Recognition Flash
- Arm Badge: Lances and Prince of Wales's feathers from 9th/12th Royal Lancers
- Abbreviation: RL

The Royal Lancers (Queen Elizabeths' Own) is an armoured cavalry regiment of the British Army. The regiment was formed by an amalgamation of the 9th/12th Royal Lancers (Prince of Wales's) and the Queen's Royal Lancers on 2 May 2015. It serves as the armoured cavalry reconnaissance regiment for 3rd Deep Reconnaissance Strike Brigade, part of 3rd (UK) Division.

== History ==
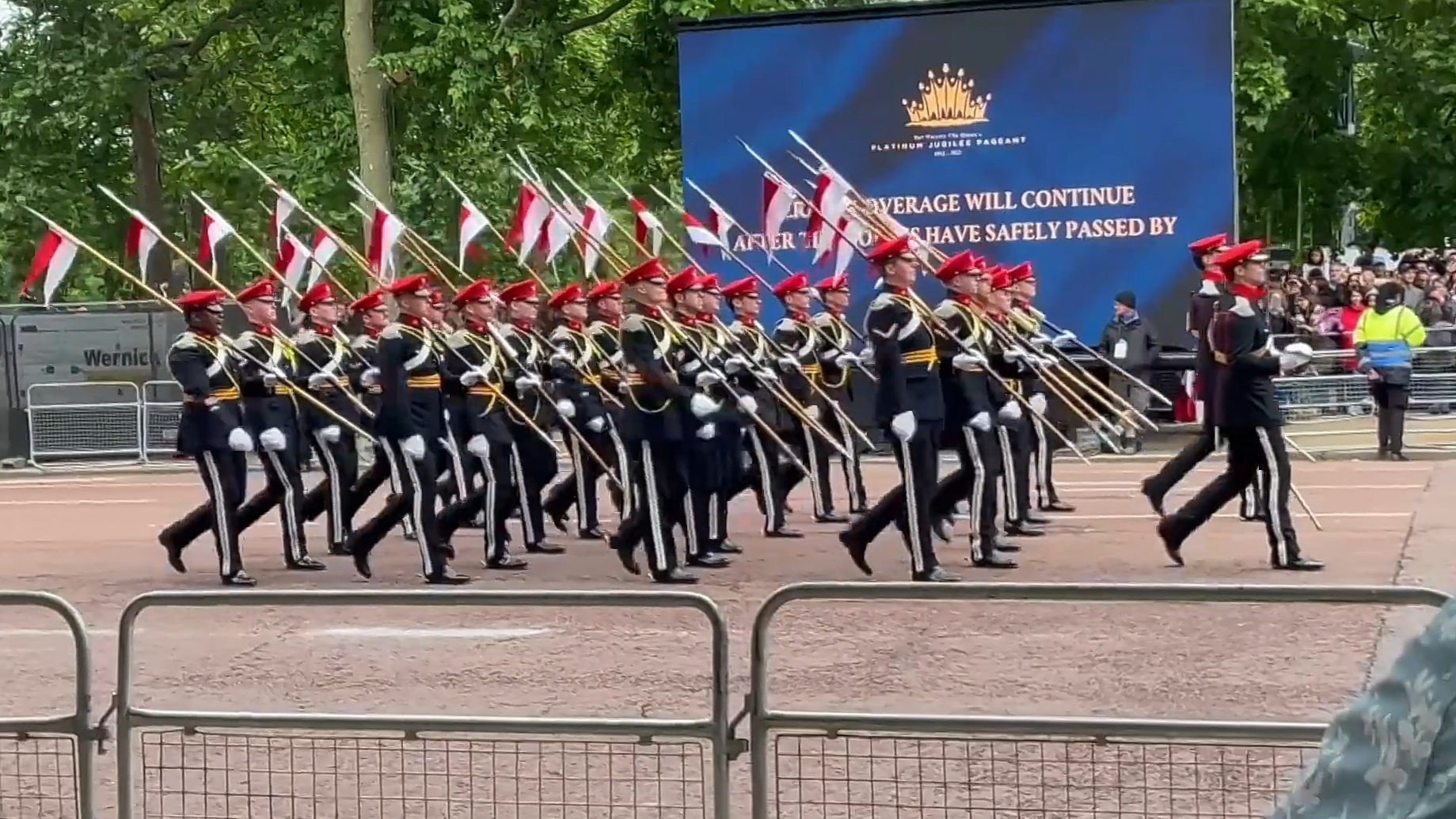
Royal Lancers at the Platinum Jubilee Pageant in June 2022.

The amalgamation of the 9th/12th Royal Lancers (Prince of Wales's) and the Queen's Royal Lancers was envisaged as part of Army 2020. The amalgamation was announced in July 2012, and the regiment was formed with an amalgamation parade before their Colonel-in-Chief, Queen Elizabeth II, at Richmond Castle on 2 May 2015.

On 5 April 2017, to mark her 70th anniversary as colonel-in-chief of the Royal Lancers and its predecessors, the queen granted the regiment the honorific suffix "Queen Elizabeths' Own", to recognise their service to Queen Elizabeth II and Queen Elizabeth the Queen Mother.

On 8 June 2023, Queen Camilla was appointed colonel-in-chief of the regiment following the death of Elizabeth II on 8 September 2022.

== Operational role ==
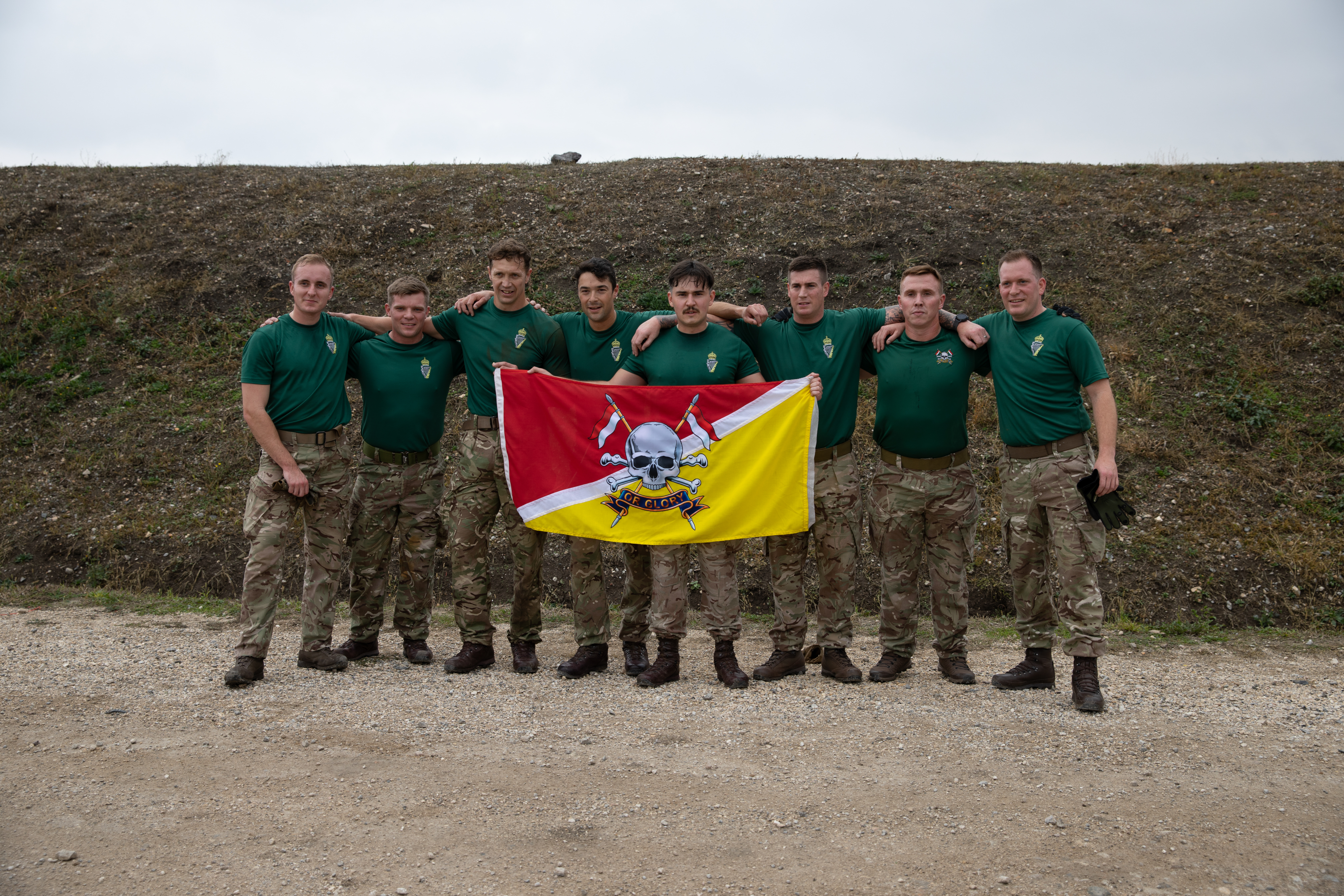
Royal Lancers at Camp Novo Selo, Kosovo in 2021

The regiment is an armoured cavalry reconnaissance regiment. Previously equipped with the Scimitar armoured reconnaissance vehicle, the regiment converted to the Warrior tracked armoured vehicle as an interim surrogate platform in 2022 and is in the process of converting to the General Dynamics Ajax as part of the Army's modernisation programme. The Panther Command and Liaison Vehicle is also currently used.

The regiment consists of three Sabre Squadrons of sixteen vehicles each and a Headquarters Squadron. The Royal Lancers forms part of the Royal Armoured Corps. It is based in Catterick as part of the 3rd Deep Reconnaissance Strike Brigade acting as Divisional Reconnaissance for the 3rd (UK) Division.

Since 2015, the regiment has deployed soldiers operationally on Operation Elgin (Bosnia / Kosovo), Operation Tosca (Cyprus), Operation Orbital (Ukraine), and as part of the NATO Enhanced Forward Presence Battle Group in Poland.

== Colonels-in-chief ==
- 2015–2022: Queen Elizabeth II
- 2023–present: Queen Camilla

== Colonels of the regiment ==
- 2015–2019: Brigadier Andrew Hughes
- 2019–2024: Col Richard Charrington
- 2024–present: General Sir James Everard

== Commanding officers ==
Regimental commanding officers included:

- 2015–2017: Lt Col Marcus J. Mudd
- 2017–2019: Lt Col Henry L. Searby
- 2019–2021: Lt Col Adam N. B. Foden
- 2021–2023: Lt Col Will J. R. Richmond
- 2023–2026: Lt Col Robin D. Davies
- 2026–present: Lt Col Andrew Horsfall

== Order of precedence ==
The regiment retains order of precedence from the more senior antecedent regiment, the 9th/12th Royal Lancers (Prince of Wales's).

| Preceded by The Queen's Royal Hussars (The Queen's Own and Royal Irish) | Cavalry Order of Precedence | Succeeded by King's Royal Hussars |

== Lineage ==
The Royal Lancers is now the last regiment in the British Army to retain the title of "lancers". It has directly or indirectly inherited the traditions of the six British lancer regiments that were in existence until a series of amalgamations began in 1922.

| 1881 Childers Reforms | 1922 Amalgamations | 1990 Options for Change | 2015 Strategic Defence and Security Review – today |
|---|---|---|---|
| 9th (The Queen's Royal) Lancers | 9th/12th Royal Lancers (Prince of Wales's) (amalgamated 1960) | | Royal Lancers (Queen Elizabeths' Own) |
| 12th (Prince Of Wales's Royal) Lancers | 9th/12th Royal Lancers (Prince of Wales's) (amalgamated 1960) | | Royal Lancers (Queen Elizabeths' Own) |
| 16th (The Queen's) Lancers | 16th/5th The Queen's Royal Lancers | Queen's Royal Lancers | Royal Lancers (Queen Elizabeths' Own) |
| 5th (Royal Irish) Lancers | 16th/5th The Queen's Royal Lancers | Queen's Royal Lancers | Royal Lancers (Queen Elizabeths' Own) |
| 17th (Duke Of Cambridge's Own) Lancers | 17th/21st Lancers | Queen's Royal Lancers | Royal Lancers (Queen Elizabeths' Own) |
| 21st (Empress of India's) Lancers | 17th/21st Lancers | Queen's Royal Lancers | Royal Lancers (Queen Elizabeths' Own) |

=== Traditions ===
The Regimental Cap Badge is referred to as the 'Motto' and stands for 'Death or Glory'.

The regiment may remain seated during the playing of the National Anthem following the service of the 17th Lancers aboard HMS Success and the acquisition of the nickname ‘The Horse Marines”.

The historic lance, complete with pennant, is still carried by detachments of the regiment on ceremonial occasions. After the Battle of Aliwal 1846 the pennants of the 16th Lancers were found to be so encrusted with blood that they stood upright and stiff. A regimental tradition carried forward through the QRL and into the modern regiment is that lance pennants are starched and crimped 16 times in commemoration. Today, on parade half of the regiment's pennants will always be crimped.
