= 7th Armoured Brigade (United Kingdom) =

Armoured brigade formation of the British Army, also known as the "Desert Rats"

Light Armoured Brigade (Egypt) 7th Light Armoured Brigade 7th Armoured Brigade
- 7th Armoured Brigade formation badge; first (left) and second (right) type.
- Active: 1938–2014
- Country: United Kingdom
- Branch: British Army
- Type: Armoured
- Size: Brigade
- Part of: 7th Armoured Division; 1st Armoured Division
- Nicknames: The Green Rats; The Desert Rats
- Motto: "All of one company"
- Engagements: Western Desert campaign, Burma campaign, Italian campaign, Iraq War, War in Afghanistan

The 7th Armoured Brigade was an armoured brigade formation of the British Army. The brigade is also known as the "Desert Rats", a nickname formerly held by the 7th Armoured Division, of which the brigade formed a part during the Second World War until late 1941.

== History ==
The brigade was raised from garrison troops stationed in North Africa in 1938. It was initially known as the Light Armoured Brigade which was part of the Mobile Division in Egypt.

When the Mobile Division became 7th Armoured Division, the Light Armoured Brigade became the 7th Armoured Brigade in February 1940. The 7th Armoured Division had a red jerboa (a nocturnal rodent indigenous to North Africa) as its emblem and became known as "The Desert Rats". The 7th Armoured Brigade, meanwhile, had a green jerboa as its emblem. The 7th Brigade became known as the "Green Rats" or the "Jungle Rats" after it moved to Burma in 1942.

=== Second World War ===
The Second World War broke out in September 1939, with both Britain and France declaring war on Germany after the German Army invaded Poland. Italy launched an invasion of Egypt, then a British Protectorate, shortly after entering the war on Germany's side in June 1940. The brigade fought in many of the major battles in North Africa, including Operation Crusader in November, fighting at Sidi Rezegh to try to relieve the Commonwealth forces in the port of Tobruk, besieged by Axis forces.

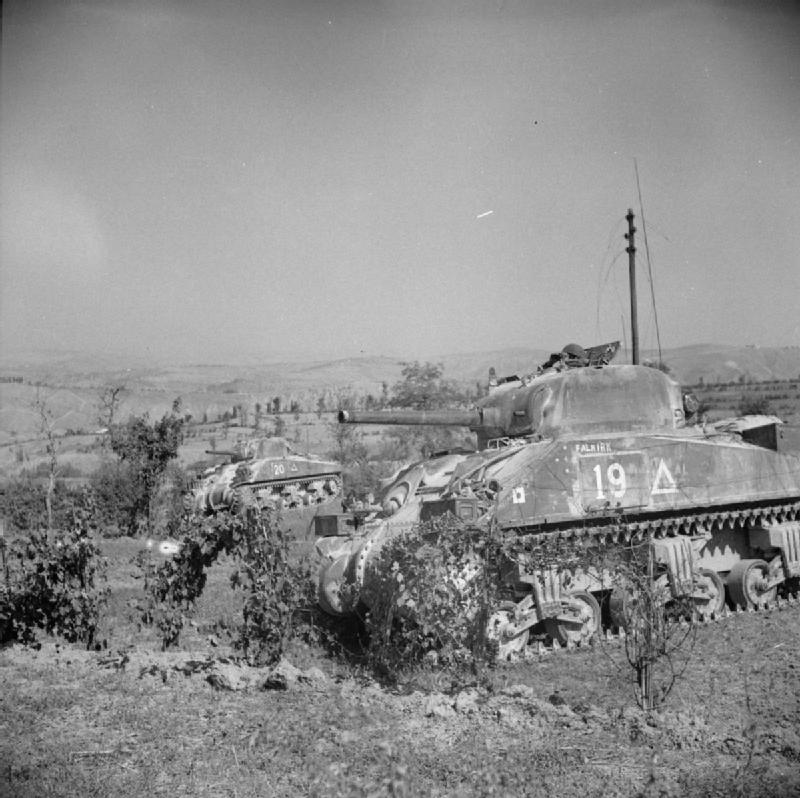
Two Sherman tanks of the 6th Royal Tank Regiment in action against German machine gun positions on the walls of San Marino, during the Battle of San Marino, September 1944.

It moved to fight in the Burma campaign in early 1942 just as the Imperial Japanese Army were pushing the Allies back. The brigade took part in the fighting retreat to India, successfully completed in May just before the monsoons would have cut them off. The 7th Armoured Brigade returned to the Middle East in 1943, based in Iraq and later Egypt. With Axis forces defeated in North Africa, the brigade's time was a quiet one until it moved to the Italian Front in April 1944 where it remained for the duration of the Second World War; fighting as part of I Canadian Corps, itself part of the British Eighth Army. The brigade, now composed of the 2nd, 6th and 8th Royal Tank Regiments, fought in the final stages of the Battle of Monte Cassino and later the Gothic Line and in Operation Grapeshot, the final offensive in Italy.

=== Post–Second World War ===
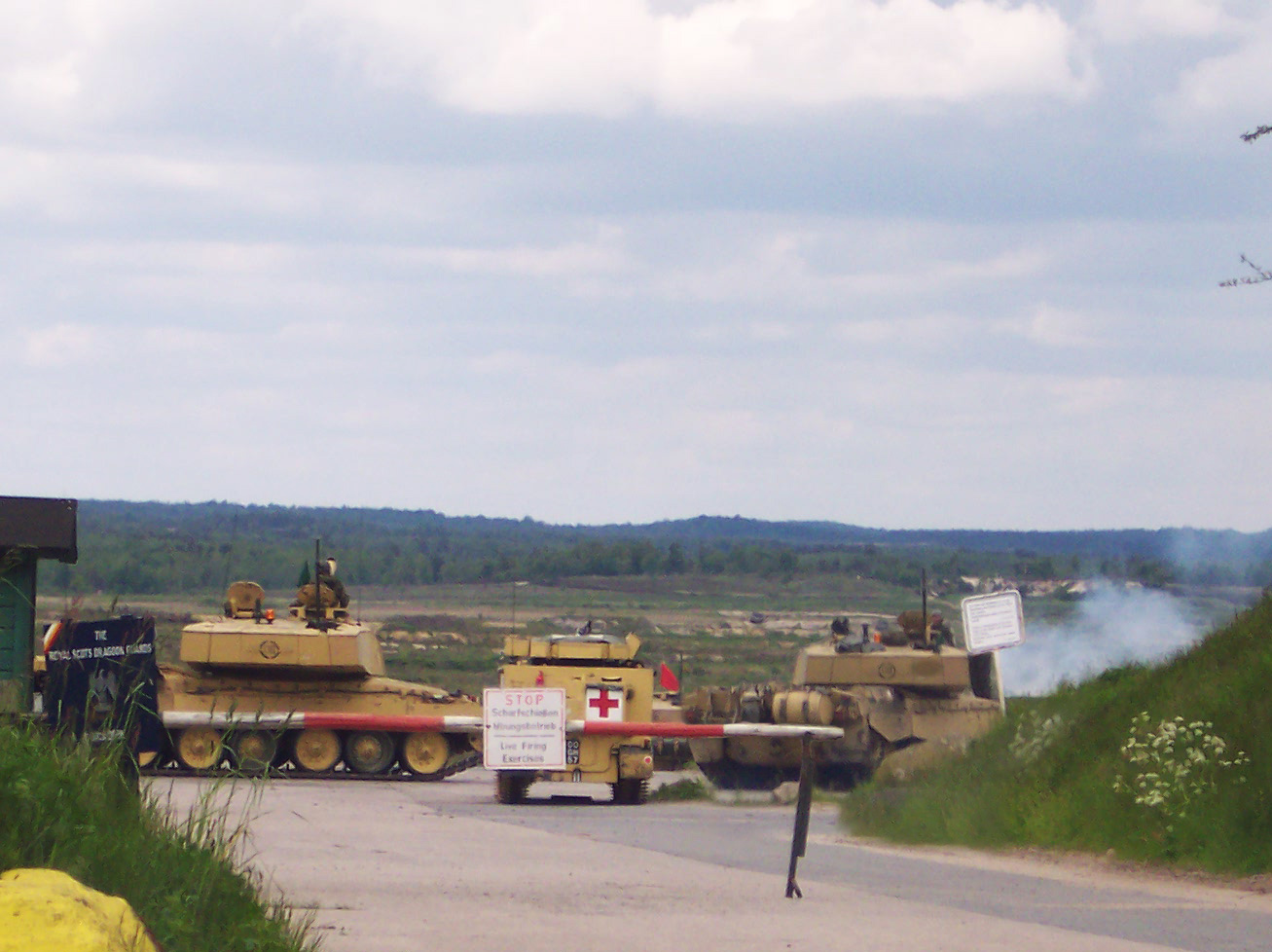
The Royal Scots Dragoon Guards (C Squadron) during live fire training exercises on Bergen-Hohne Training Area (Germany) near the Fallingbostel station

==== Reformation ====
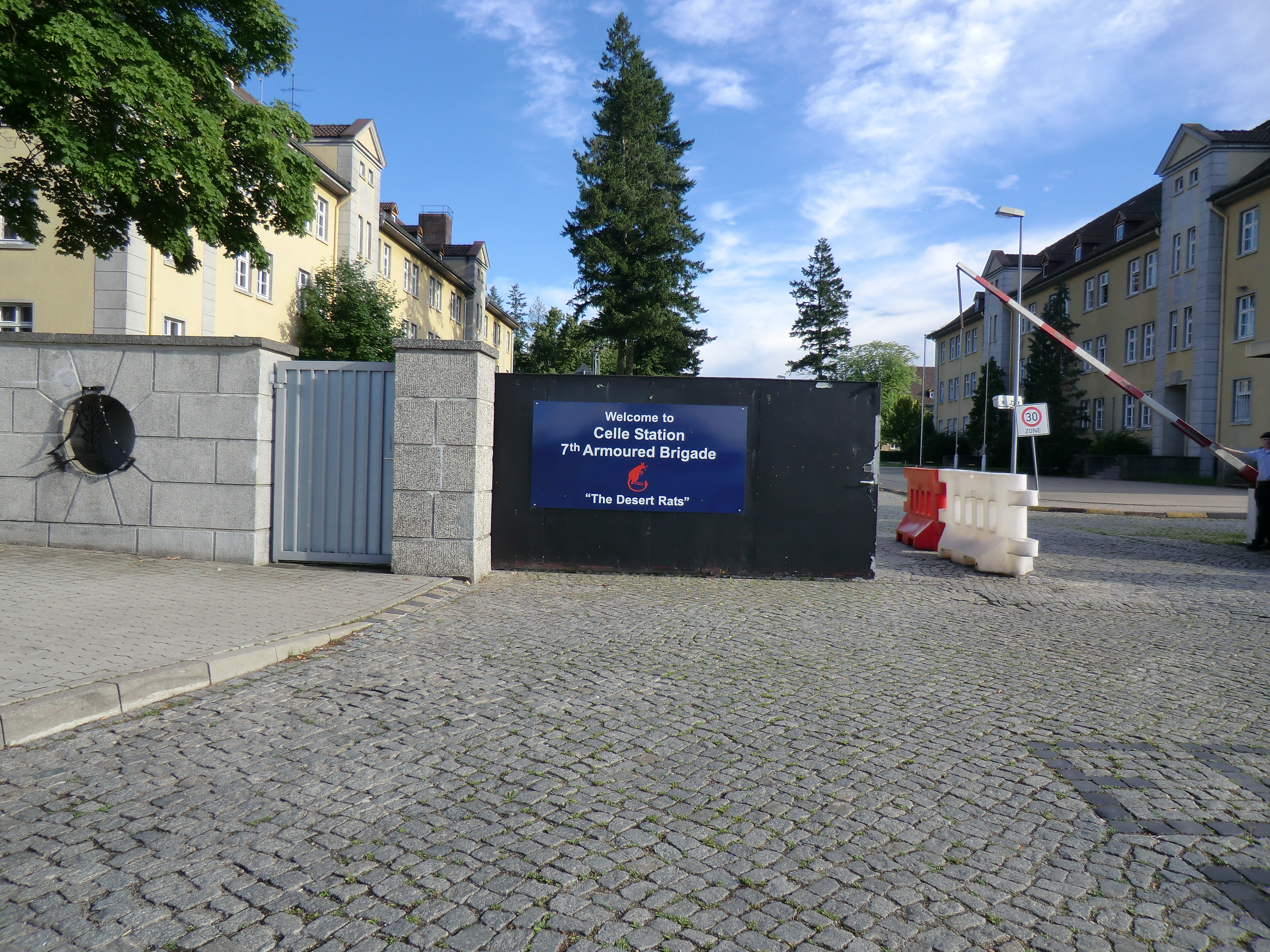
Sign at the Celle Station of the 7th Armoured Brigade, 2012

Shortly after the end of the Second World War, the 7th Armoured Brigade was disbanded and the 22nd Armoured Brigade was re-designated as the 7th Armoured Brigade, based in Germany as part of the British Army of the Rhine (BAOR).

After the 7th Armoured Division was disbanded in 1958, the 7th Armoured Brigade adopted its insignia and nickname, perpetuating the history of the famed division. It was one of two "square brigades" assigned to 1st (UK) Armoured Division when this was formed in 1976. After being briefly converted to "Task Force Alpha" in the late 1970s, the brigade was reinstated in 1981, assigned to the 1st Armoured Division again and was based at Bournemouth Barracks in Soltau.

==== Kuwait and Iraq ====
The 7th Armoured Brigade returned to the desert when it arrived in Saudi Arabia in October 1990 as part of Operation Granby, intended to protect Saudi Arabia from invasion by Saddam Hussein's Iraq. It included the Royal Scots Dragoon Guards, the Queen's Royal Irish Hussars and 1st Battalion, The Staffordshire Regiment. The brigade, commanded by Brigadier Patrick Cordingley, later took part in the Coalition of the Gulf War ground campaign to liberate Iraqi-occupied Kuwait on 24 February 1991 that began after a sustained air campaign. The Desert Rats, along with the rest of the 1st Armoured Division, carried out a left-hook manoeuvre that swung round the Iraqi Republican Guard. The brigade advanced deep into Iraqi territory, encountering some armour of the Republican Guard. The ground campaign formally ended on 28 February with the liberation of Kuwait achieved.

==== Balkans ====
The brigade moved to Campbell Barracks at Hohne (Germany) in 1993. From there the brigade deployed to Bosnia in May 1994 as part of the NATO IFOR peacekeeping organisation. The brigade returned for another tour-of-duty in April 1997, joining IFOR's NATO replacement known as SFOR. After the Kosovo War in 1999, the 7th Armoured Brigade returned to the Balkans for a tour-of-duty in Kosovo in 2000, based in the capital Pristina.

==== Iraq ====
Just before Operation Telic began (Britain's contribution to the 2003 invasion of Iraq), the brigade, commanded by Brigadier Graham Binns, moved to Kuwait where it undertook extensive training and was "desertised" for service in the Middle East. The brigade, consisting of 112 Challenger 2 tanks, 140 Warriors and 32 AS-90 155 mm self-propelled howitzers, entered Iraq on 21 March. The main objective of the Desert Rats was to advance towards Iraq's second largest city, Basra, and help encircle and isolate it. The brigade, led by the 1st Fusiliers Battlegroup, made a rapid advance towards the city and soon reached its outskirts, securing Basra Airport and the critical bridges across the Shatt al-Arab. The advance by the brigade met sporadic though fierce resistance, with The Queen's Royal Irish Hussars, including an engagement between 14 Challenger 2s of the Royal Scots Dragoon Guards and 14 Iraqi tanks, all of the Iraqi tanks being destroyed. Initially the brigade was faced by very spirited but un-coordinated attacks from Basra and in the town of Az Zubayr. These attacks were initially orchestrated by members of the Iraqi secret police, who used violence and threats against family members to coerce men to attack the Desert Rats and other elements of the 1st Armoured Division. As their influence waned, so did the frequency and ferocity of the Iraqi attacks.

The 1st Armoured Division, including 7th Brigade, then undertook a number of raids into the city against specific targets, but in a plan that was very patient bided their time on the outskirts of Basra. On 6 April the Desert Rats, led by Challenger 2s of the Royal Scots Dragoon Guards, Queen's Royal Lancers and 2nd Royal Tank Regiment with Warriors of the 1st Fusiliers, Irish Guards and Black Watch pushed into the city on 6 April and stayed. They met sporadic resistance from Iraqi soldiers and irregulars known as Fedayeen. Basra was, for the most part, now controlled by 1st Division though further engagements did take place. The war was officially declared over on 1 May. The Desert Rats remained in Iraq after the war, acting as peacekeepers and helping to rebuild the country while based in the British sector in the south of Iraq. The brigade began to leave in late June 2003, being replaced by 19th Mechanised Brigade.

Between October 2005 and May 2006 the brigade deployed to Iraq again for Operation Telic 7 under the command of Brigadier Patrick Marriott.

==== Afghanistan ====
In 2011, some elements of the brigade deployed to Afghanistan. In October 2013, 7th Armored Brigade deployed to Afghanistan's Helmand Province, Kandahar, and Kabul.

==== Reorganization ====
On 5 March 2013, the British Secretary of State for Defence, Philip Hammond, announced that the 7th Armoured Brigade would have its Challenger 2 tanks and heavy armoured battalions removed over the next decade. Although the brigade itself was re-designated as an infantry brigade, it retains its famed "Desert Rats" insignia. It forms part of the Adaptable Force under Army 2020. The decision was met with regret by former 7th Armoured Brigade commander Patrick Cordingley, who said that the "changes would still dismay veterans and the general public". On 14 November 2014, the brigade formally stepped out of its armour role into that of an infantry brigade as 7th Infantry Brigade.

== Brigade composition ==
=== Circa 2007 ===
The composition was as follows:

- 207 Signal Squadron, Royal Corps of Signals
- 2nd Royal Tank Regiment
- Royal Scots Dragoon Guards
- 1st Battalion, Royal Regiment of Fusiliers
- 4th Battalion, Royal Regiment of Scotland
- 3rd Regiment, Royal Horse Artillery
- 32 Engineer Regiment, Royal Engineers
- 2 Logistic Support Regiment, RLC.
- 29 (Armored) Combat Support Medical Squadron, Royal Army Medical Corps
- 2nd Battalion, Royal Electrical and Mechanical Engineers
- 111 Provost Company, Royal Military Police

== Brigade commanders ==
Commanders have included:

- 1939–1941 Brigadier Hugh Edward Russell
- 1941–1941 Brigadier George Mark Oswald Davy
- 1941–1943 Brigadier John Henry Anstice
- 1943–1945 Brigadier Otho L. Prior-Palmer
- 1945–1946 Brigadier Kenneth C. Cooper
- 1947–1949 Brigadier Francis N. Mitchell
- 1949–1950 Brigadier Henry R.B. Foote
- 1950–1953 Brigadier Ralph Younger
- 1953-1955 Brigadier Richard W. Hobson
- 1964–1965 Brigadier Ian Gill
- 1965–1967 Brigadier Richard Worsley
- 1968–1970 Brigadier Robert Ford
- 1972–1973 Brigadier Ian Baker
- 1973–1975 Brigadier Martin Farndale
- 1976–1977 Brigadier Norman Arthur
- 1977–1980 Brigadier Patrick Palmer
- 1980–1982 Brigadier Anthony Mullens
- 1982–1984 Brigadier Richard Swinburn
- 1984–1986 Brigadier Richard Barron
- 1986–1988 Brigadier Christopher Wallace
- 1990–1991 Brigadier Patrick Cordingley
- 1991–1993 Brigadier Timothy Sulivan
- 1993–1993 Brigadier John Kiszely
- 1993–1994 Brigadier Andrew Ridgway
- 1996–1999 Brigadier Andrew Stewart
- 1998–2000 Brigadier Richard Shirreff
- 2001–2003 Brigadier Graham Binns
- 2003–2005 Brigadier Adrian Bradshaw
- 2005–2007 Brigadier Patrick Marriott
- 2007–2009 Brigadier Sandy Storrie
- 2009–2011 Brigadier Nick Welch
- 2011–2013 Brigadier Paul Nanson
- 2013–2014 Brigadier James Woodham

== See also ==
- 4th Light Brigade Combat Team
- British armoured formations of the Second World War
- List of British brigades of the Second World War

== General sources ==
- Watson, Graham (2005). The British Army in Germany: An Organizational History 1947–2004. Tiger Lily. ISBN 978-0972029698.
