= QRL =

QRL is a three letter acronym that can stand for several things:

- Qingdao Red Lions F.C., a Chinese association football club
- Quantum Resistant Ledger, a blockchain solution utilizing Post-Quantum Cryptography (PQC)
- The Queen's Royal Lancers, an armoured regiment of the British Army
- Queensland Rugby League, the governing body of rugby league football in the Australian state of Queensland
- QRL, one of the Q codes used in radiocommunication, meaning "I am busy"
- A QR Code with a URL (web site address) encoded within it
