= James Everard =

British general (born 1962)

General Sir James Everard KCB CBE
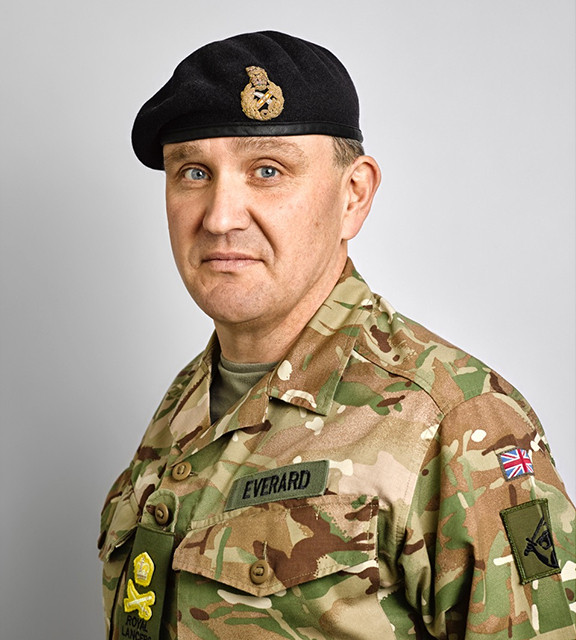
- Official portrait, 2016
- Born: 23 September 1962 (age 64)
- Military career
- Allegiance: United Kingdom
- Branch: British Army
- Service years: 1983–2020
- Rank: General
- Commands: Deputy Supreme Allied Commander Europe; Commander Field Army; 3rd Division; 20th Armoured Brigade; Queen's Royal Lancers
- Conflicts: Bosnian War; Iraq War
- Awards: Knight Commander of the Order of the Bath; Commander of the Order of the British Empire; Queen's Commendation for Valuable Service (2)

General Sir James Rupert Everard, KCB, CBE (born 23 September 1962) is a retired senior British Army officer who served as NATO's Deputy Supreme Allied Commander Europe.

== Career ==
Educated at Uppingham School, Everard was commissioned into the 17th/21st Lancers in June 1983. In 1995, as Chief of Staff, 4th Armoured Brigade, he was deployed to the United Nations Protection Force HQ, Sector South-West, and subsequently as part of the leading UK element of the NATO Implementation Force (IFOR) in Bosnia. Then in 1999 he became Military Assistant to the Commander of the Kosovo Force (KFOR). He became commanding officer of the Queen's Royal Lancers in September 2000 and deployed as part of the United Nations Peacekeeping Force in Cyprus.

In December 2005 he became Commander of 20th Armoured Brigade in which capacity he was deployed to Basra in Iraq where he made an attempt to target corruption. The brigade left Basra in November 2006 and returned to their home of Paderborn in Germany. He was appointed Director Commitments at Land Command in 2007, General Officer Commanding 3rd (UK) Division in 2009 and Assistant Chief of the General Staff in April 2011. He went on to be Deputy Chief of the Defence Staff (Military Strategy and Operations) in March 2013 and became Commander Land Forces in September 2014 (post renamed Commander Field Army in November 2015). In March 2017 he was appointed as NATO's Deputy Supreme Allied Commander Europe (DSACEUR) and was promoted to the rank of general. Everard served as Patron of the Army LGBT Forum from 2010.

Everard retired from the British Army on 23 September 2020.

He was appointed Colonel of The Royal Lancers (Queen Elizabeth's Own) on 31 December 2024.

== Personal life ==
He is married to Caroline and has three children.

== Honours ==
Everard was awarded a Queen's Commendation for Valuable Service in November 1996, appointed Officer of the Order of the British Empire (OBE) in April 2000 and Commander of the Order of the British Empire (CBE) in June 2005, and awarded a second Queen's Commendation for Valuable Service in July 2007 for his work commanding 20th Armoured Brigade during Operation Telic 8 in Iraq. He was appointed Knight Commander of the Order of the Bath (KCB) in the 2016 New Year Honours.

Military offices
Preceded by Barney White-Spunner	General Officer Commanding the 3rd (UK) Mechanised Division; 2009–2011	Succeeded by John Lorimer
Preceded by Richard Barrons	Assistant Chief of the General Staff; 2011–2013	Succeeded by David Cullen
Preceded by Richard Barrons	Deputy Chief of the Defence Staff (Operations); 2013–2014	Succeeded by Gordon Messenger
Preceded by Sir Nick Carter	Commander Land Forces (Commander Field Army from November 2015); 2014–2016	Succeeded by Patrick Sanders
Preceded by Sir Adrian Bradshaw	Deputy Supreme Allied Commander Europe; 2017–2020	Succeeded by Tim Radford
