= Richard Gustavus Hamilton-Russell =

Irish peer, soldier and polo player

Brigadier Richard Gustavus Hamilton-Russell DSO, LVO, DL (4 February 1909 – 2 March 1999) was an Irish peer, soldier and polo player.

== Biography ==
He was the son of Gustavus William Hamilton-Russell, 9th Viscount Boyne and Lady Margaret Selina Lascelles. He was educated at Eton College.

Hamilton-Russell fought in World War II and was decorated with the award of Companion, Distinguished Service Order (D.S.O.) in 1943 and the award of Companion, Distinguished Service Order (D.S.O.) (and bar) in 1944. He became a Brigadier in the 17th/21st Lancers. In 1956 he became a member of the Gentlemen at Arms the British Monarch's personal bodyguard. Between 1957 and 1965 served as Colonel of the 17th/21st Lancers.

In 1968 his position was High Sheriff of Yorkshire and in 1973 Deputy Lieutenant (D.L.) of the North Riding, Yorkshire. In 1977 he became a Lieutenant of the Royal Victorian Order (L.V.O.).

== Family ==
In 1939 Hamilton-Russell married Hon. Pamela Penelope Cayzer, the daughter of Herbert Robin Cayzer, 1st Baron Rotherwick and his wife Freda Penelope Rathbourne. They had three children; Brian Gustavus Hamilton-Russell, Richard Desmond Hamilton-Russell and Veronica Anne Lay.
