= William Massy =

Lieutenant-General William Massy CB
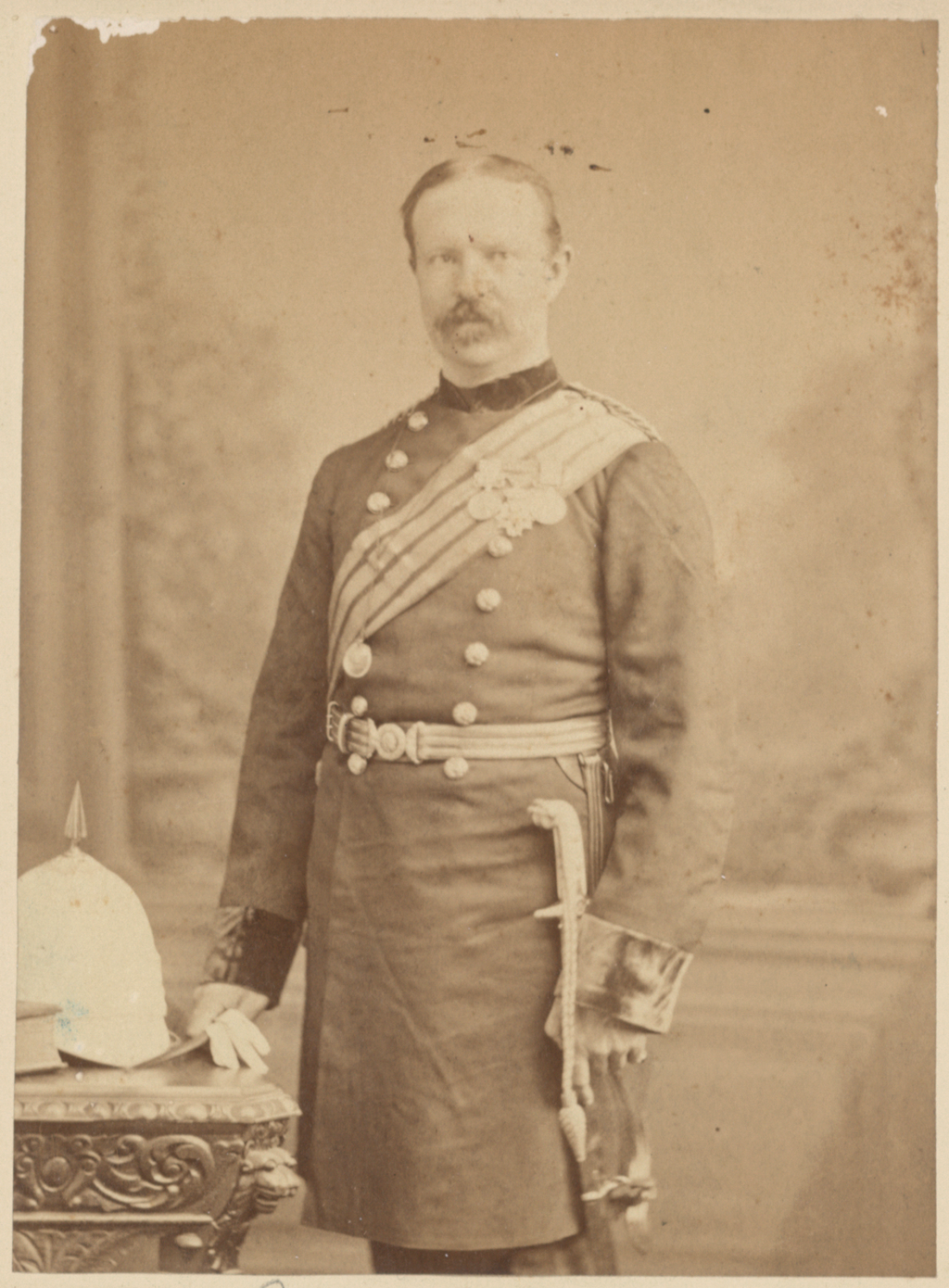
- Born: 24 November 1838; Grantstown, County Tipperary, Ireland
- Died: 20 September 1906 (aged 67); Grantstown, County Tipperary, Ireland
- Military career
- Allegiance: United Kingdom
- Branch: British Army
- Service years: 1854–1898
- Rank: Lieutenant-General
- Commands: 5th Royal Irish Lancers
- Conflicts: Sevastopol; Chernaya; Second Afghan War
- Awards: C.B.; Legion of Honour

Lieutenant-General William Godfrey Dunham Massy CB (24 November 1838 – 20 September 1906) was a senior officer in the British Army.

== Early life ==
He was born the eldest son of Major Henry William Massy (1816–1895) of Grantstown and Gonmaine, County Tipperary, Ireland and educated at Trinity College, Dublin, where he graduated B.A. in 1859.

In the meantime he had joined the British Army as an ensign on 27 October 1854 and been promoted to lieutenant. Posted to the Crimea, he had arrived during the latter part of the Siege of Sevastopol. He was later under fire at the Battle of the Chernaya and commanded the grenadiers of the 19th Regiment of Foot at the assault of the Redan on 8 September 1855. During the last engagement he was seriously wounded by a ball which through his left thigh, shattering the bone. Left lying on the ground, he was finally rescued, and recovered after six months' confinement to his camp stretcher. His courage was commended in a special despatch by Sir James Simpson and he became popularly known as 'Redan' Massy.

== In India and Afghanistan ==
Massy was promoted captain in 1860 and awarded the 5th class of the Legion of Honour and the Turkish medal. In 1863 he was made a major and served as assistant adjutant-general in India. On his promotion as lieutenant-colonel he commanded the 5th Royal Irish Lancers in India from 1871 to 1879.

During the Second Anglo-Afghan War of 1879–80 he commanded a cavalry brigade and took a prominent part in the Battle of Charasiab on 6 October 1879, capturing 75 pieces of Afghan artillery. During the subsequent operations in the Charde Valley, Massy was despatched in pursuit of the enemy but failed to cut off their retreat.

In the actions round Kabul in December, he was ordered to start from Sherpur with his cavalry and meet up with General Macpherson's brigade. Advancing too far, he was cut off by 10,000 Afghans at Killa Kazi, and after an unsuccessful charge and the abandonment of guns he had to be rescued by the main force. General Roberts held Massy responsible for the disaster and he was severely censured and removed from his command.

However Massy was soon reappointed to a brigade by George, Duke of Cambridge, the Commander-in-Chief, and received the Afghan Medal with two clasps. He became major-general in 1886 and was nominated C.B. on 21 June 1887. He held the command of the troops in Ceylon from 1888 to 1893, when he attained the rank of lieutenant-general.

== Later life ==
On 4 October 1896 Massy was given the colonelcy of the 5th Royal Irish Lancers and on 1 April 1898 placed on the retired list. He was a Justice of the Peace and Deputy Lieutenant for County Tipperary and was appointed High Sheriff of Tipperary for 1899.

Massy died in 1906 at the family residence, Grantstown Hall, Tipperary.

== Family ==
Massy married in 1869 Elizabeth Jane, eldest daughter of Major-General Sir Thomas Seaton, of Ackworth, Suffolk, and the widow of George Arnold, with whom he had one daughter, Gertrude Annette Seaton, who married in 1893 Colonel James George Cockburn.
