= James Melville Babington =

Lieutenant-General Sir James Melville Babington KCB KCMG JP DL
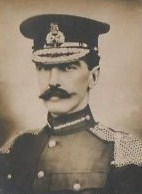
- Babington in 1900
- Born: 31 July 1854; Corstorphine, Scotland
- Died: 15 June 1936 (aged 81)
- Military career
- Allegiance: United Kingdom
- Branch: British Army
- Service years: 1873–c. 1919
- Rank: Lieutenant-General
- Commands: 23rd Division; Lowland Mounted Brigade; 1st Cavalry Brigade
- Conflicts: Bechuanaland Expedition; Second Boer War; First World War
- Awards: Knight Commander of the Order of the Bath; Knight Commander of the Order of St Michael and St George; Mentioned in Despatches; Commander of the Legion of Honour (France); Croix de guerre (France); Officer of the Military Order of Savoy (Italy); War Cross for Military Valor (Italy)

Lieutenant-General Sir James Melville Babington KCB, KCMG, JP, DL (31 July 1854 – 15 June 1936) was a British Army officer and a renowned leader of cavalry, making a name for himself for his actions in the Second Boer War. He was Commander of the New Zealand Defence Force and one of the most respected British generals in the First World War, in command of the 23rd Division. After the war he was Commander of the British Forces in Italy.

General Babington's image was chosen by Paul McCartney and used by the Beatles to depict the fictional "Sgt. Pepper" for the album Sgt. Pepper's Lonely Hearts Club Band in 1967.

== Early life and military career ==
Babington was born in Scotland at Hanley House, Corstorphine, on 31 July 1854 to William Babington (1826–1913) and Augusta Mary Melville (1832–1913), daughter of James Moncrieff Melville, writer to the signet. His ancestors were of the Anglo-Irish branch of the Babington family. He was a cousin to Sir Anthony Babington.

In September 1873, Babington was commissioned as a lieutenant in the 16th Lancers, known as the Scarlets. From 1877 to 1880 he was Adjutant of the regiment, the future CIGS William Robertson serving in the ranks under him. In 1884 he accompanied Sir Charles Warren on the Bechuanaland Expedition, where he was "honourably mentioned". From January 1889, when he was seconded from his regiment in order to serve on the staff, to July 1890, Captain Babington was aide-de-camp to Sir Evelyn Wood when the latter was commanding at Aldershot. This post was both a liberal military education and a marked compliment to the Lancer's ability: Sir Evelyn was known to surround himself with only the most capable of officers. Returning as a major to regimental duty, Babington succeeded to the command of the 16th Lancers in 1892. He was appointed to succeed Major Horace Smith-Dorrien, later a general, as an assistant adjutant general in India and was promoted to colonel on 1 April 1896. He held this appointment until 1899. Returning to England, he was staff commander of the Cavalry Brigade at Aldershot.

== Second Boer War ==
During the Second Boer War, Babington was promoted to major general on the staff and took command of the 1st Cavalry Brigade, part of Lieutenant General Sir John French's Cavalry Division, being granted the local rank of major general whilst employed in this role. He took part in the Battle of Magersfontein on 10–11 December, in which the defending Boer force defeated the advancing British forces amongst heavy casualties for the latter. Babington was mentioned in the despatch from Lord Methuen describing the battle. In February 1900 he was severely criticised for his part in the battle of Koodoosberg. Richard Danes reports:

"So Macdonald’s plan failed. Not by any fault of his own, but purely owing to the fact that Brigadier-General Babington declined to hurry his cattle. FieldMarshal Lord Roberts liked men who could move when movement was necessary, and the first thing he did on hearing of Babington’s failure was to supersede him in his command."

He was regarded as an expert in the management and deployment of every sort of mounted troop, and he later gained many a decisive victory in South Africa, earning himself a name to be feared among the Boers. He left South Africa in September 1901, returning to England in early October.

== Inter-war years ==
From 1902 to 1907, he was in New Zealand as commandant of the New Zealand Defence Force, with the local rank of major general while so employed. He was placed on half-pay in December 1906 when he relinquished this position and was made a Companion of the Order of the Bath in the 1907 Birthday Honours in June. He retired from the army in September and was granted the honorary rank of major general. He was also appointed honorary colonel of the 5th Mounted Rifles (Otago Hussars). Returning to England, he was on 1 April 1908 given the command of the Lowland Mounted Brigade, part of the newly created Territorial Force (TF), until 1913 and the colonelcy of the 16th The Queen's Lancers in 1909, transferring after amalgamation in 1922 to be colonel of the 16th/5th Lancers (1922 to death).

== First World War ==
On the outbreak of the First World War in August 1914, he was given the command of the 23rd Division, part of Kitchener's Army, and was granted the temporary rank of major general in September 1914. He was then described as "an elderly but fearless man who was universally popular". Under him, the 23rd Division, which served on the Western Front from August 1915 and from November 1917 until the end of the war on the Italian Front, became known as "a remarkably hard-fighting and efficient division".

He was one of only a few commanding officers who saw to it that his men were properly kitted out, obtaining approval to spend £17,000 on clothing, and sending two officers to the north of England before the division went overseas to buy 20,000 sets of underclothes and boots.

Following the war he was commander of the British Forces in Italy. He was promoted to major general on the active list in June 1917 as a result of "distinguished service in the Field". and retired with the rank of lieutenant general.

He held the French Croix de guerre with Palm, and the Italian Croce di Guerra. He was a Commander of the Legion of Honour and an Officer of the Military Order of Savoy.

== Post-war years ==
Babington, who relinquished the temporary rank of lieutenant general on 6 March 1919, lived at Pinnacle Hill, near Kelso, Roxburghshire, which his family came to through the Maitlands of Penpont. He married Eleanor Lawson (1868–1943), daughter of Thomas James Lawson of Veteran Hall, Prospect, New South Wales. Their son, Geoffrey Babington (1902–1956), married Lady Anne Katherine Granville Scrope Egerton (1908–1964), daughter of John Egerton, 4th Earl of Ellesmere, and sister of the 6th Duke of Sutherland.

== Books ==
- Robertson, Sir William Robert (1921). From Private to Field Marshal. London: Constable. ASIN B008TCWACC.

Honorary titles
New regiment	Colonel of the 16th/5th Lancers; 1922–1936	Succeeded by Sir Hubert de la Poer Gough
Preceded by William Thomas Dickson	Colonel of the 16th The Queen's Lancers; 1909–1922	amalgamated to form 16th/5th Lancers
