= Queen's Royal Lancers =

The Queen's Royal Lancers
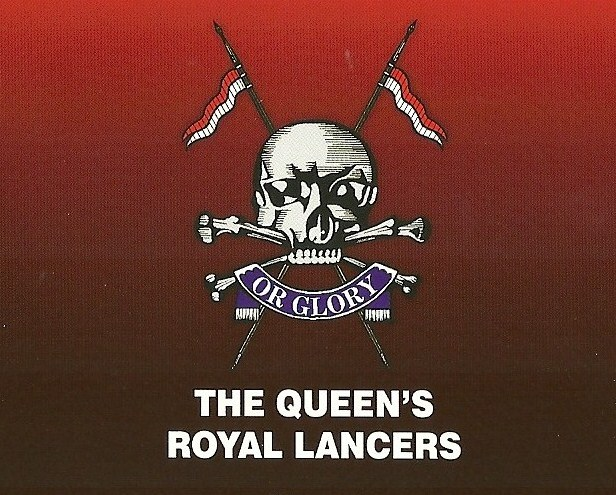
- Badge of the regiment
- Active: 25 June 1993 – 2 May 2015
- Allegiance: United Kingdom
- Branch: British Army
- Type: Line Cavalry
- Role: Formation Reconnaissance
- Size: One regiment
- Part of: Royal Armoured Corps
- Garrison/HQ: RHQ - Prince William of Gloucester Barracks, Grantham; Regiment - Catterick
- Nickname: The Death or Glory Boys
- Motto: Death or Glory
- March: Quick - Stable Jacket; Slow - Omdurman
- Engagements: Battle of the Boyne; War of the Spanish Succession; American Revolution; Napoleonic Wars; Crimean War; *Battle of Balaclava; Indian Mutiny; Mahdist War; South Africa; World War I World War II; Iraq War; War in Afghanistan

Commanders
- Current commander: None (regiment defunct)
- Colonel-in-Chief: The Queen
- Colonel of the Regiment: Major-General Patrick Marriott CB CBE

Insignia
- Tactical Recognition Flash
- Abbreviation: QRL

The Queen's Royal Lancers (QRL) was a cavalry regiment of the British Army. It was formed in 1993 and amalgamated with the 9th/12th Royal Lancers (Prince of Wales's) on 2 May 2015 to form the Royal Lancers.

== History ==
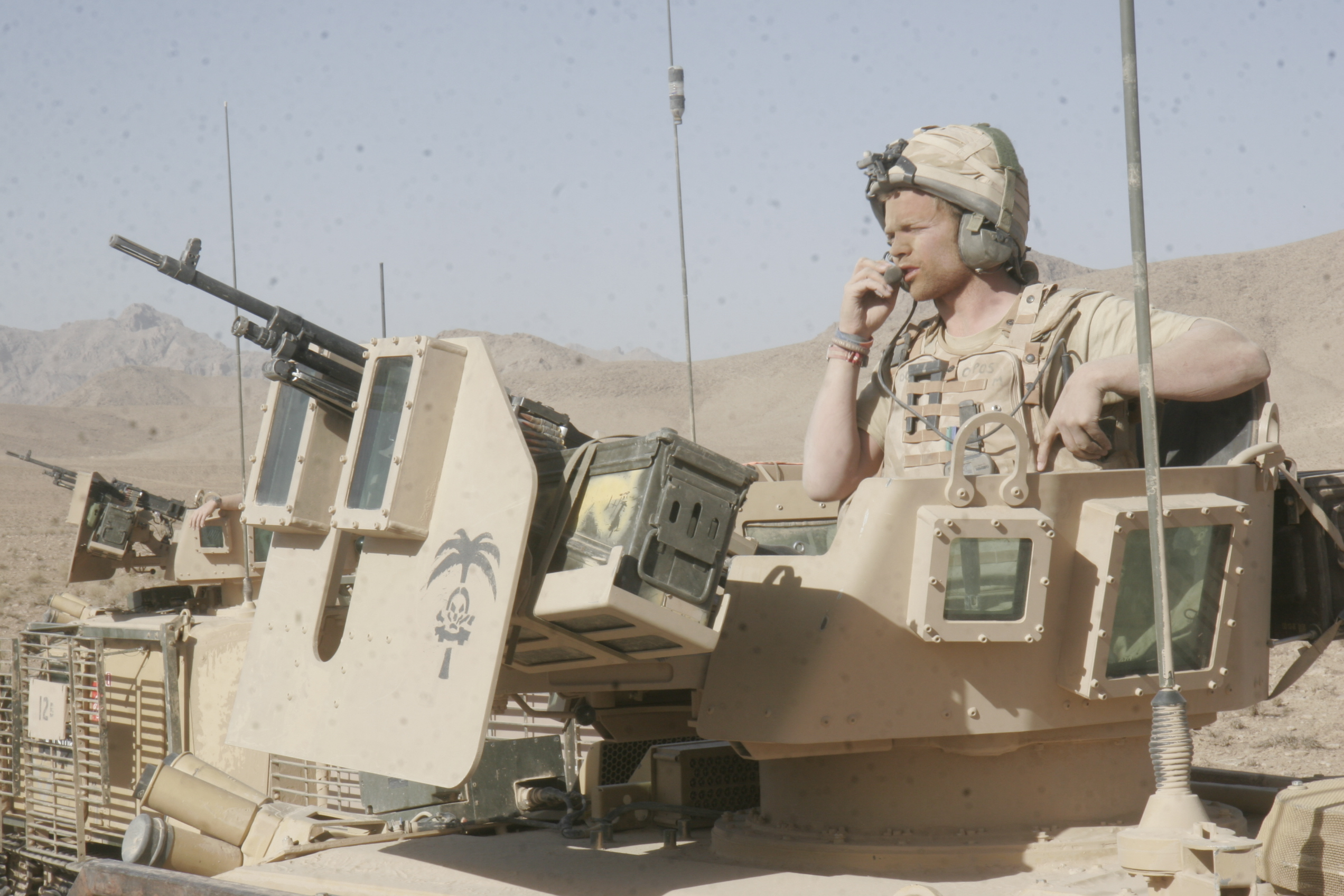
Queen's Royal Lancers providing security for Operation Eagle's Summit

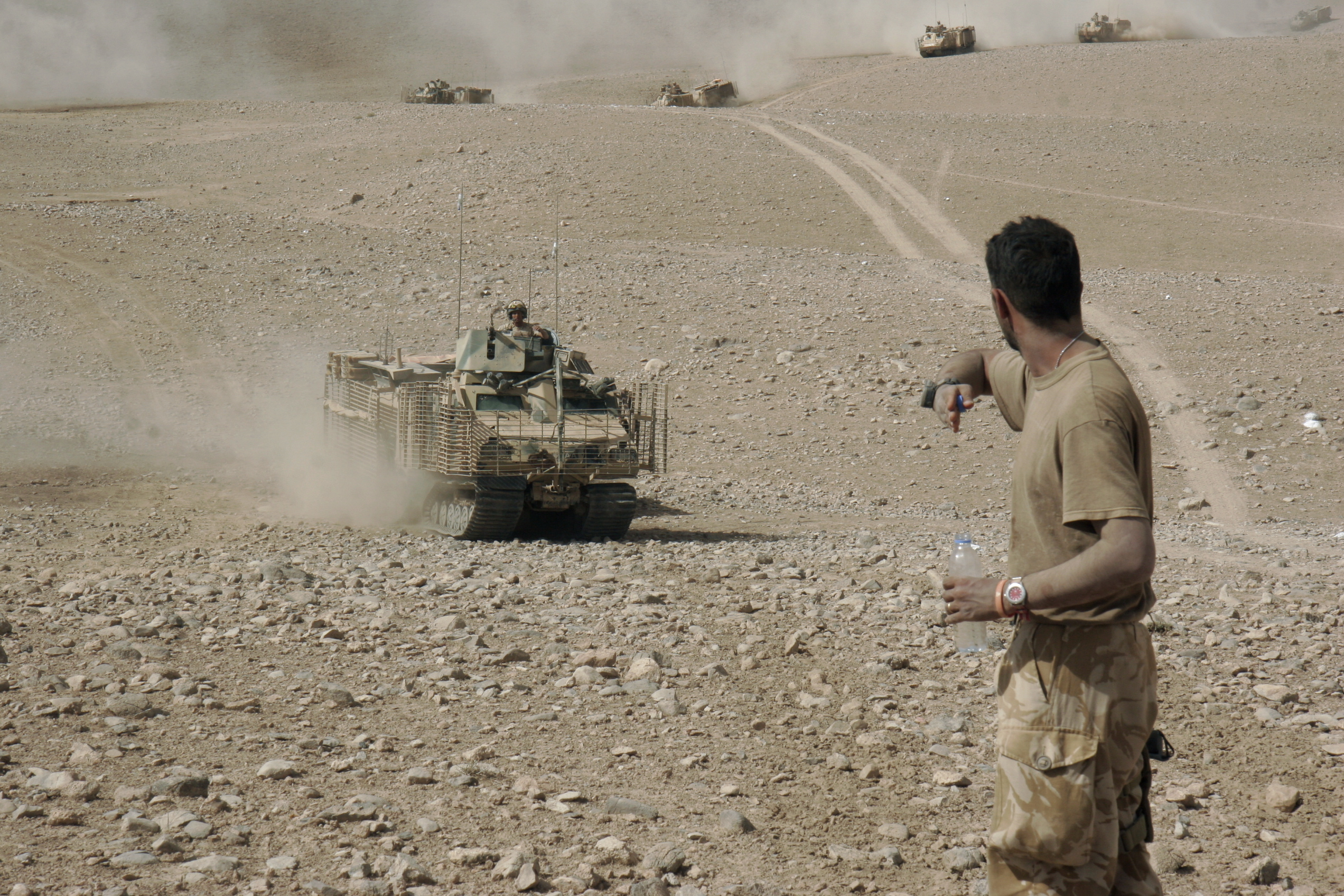
Queen's Royal Lancers, in Helmand Province of Afghanistan, 2008.

The regiment was formed in 1993 by the amalgamation of the 16th/5th Queen's Royal Lancers with the 17th/21st Lancers.

From its formation, the regiment served in the armoured role with first Challenger 1, then Challenger 2. However, in 2005, as part of the re-organisation of the army, the regiment started converting to the formation reconnaissance role, re-equipping with the Scimitar armoured reconnaissance vehicle.

As part of the Army 2020 reforms intended to reduce the size of the British Army in line with the Strategic Defence and Security Review, it was announced that the 9th/12th Royal Lancers would amalgamate with the Queen's Royal Lancers to form a single regiment, the Royal Lancers, on 2 May 2015.

== Organisation ==
The regiment was organised into four squadrons, each of which perpetuates one of the antecedent regiments:

- the 16th Lancer Squadron,
- the 17th Lancer Squadron,
- the 21st Lancer Squadron,
- and the 5th Lancer Squadron.

== Regimental museum ==
The Royal Lancers and Nottinghamshire Yeomanry Museum is based at Thoresby Hall in Nottinghamshire.

== Traditions ==
The regiment's nickname, the 'Death or Glory Boys', came from their cap badge and was known as "the motto". This was the combined cap badges of the two antecedent regiments, and features a pair of crossed lances, from the 16th/5th Queen's Royal Lancers, together with a skull and crossbones, below which is a ribbon containing the words 'Or Glory'. This comes from the 17th/21st Lancers, and was the cap badge of the 17th Lancers (the original 'Death or Glory Boys').

== Battle honours ==
The battle honours are:
16th/5th battle honours

Combined honours before amalgamation of 16th and 5th Lancers:

- Blenheim, Ramillies, Oudenarde, Malplaquet, Beaumont, Willems, Talavera, Fuentes d'Onor, Salamanca, Vittoria, Nive, Peninsula, Waterloo, Bhurtpore, Ghuznee 1839, Afghanistan 1839, Maharajpore, Aliwal, Sobraon, Suakin 1885, Relief of Kimberley, Paardeberg, Siege of Ladysmith, South Africa 1899-1902
- First World War: Mons, Le Cateau, Retreat from Mons, Marne 1914, Aisne 1914, Messines 1914, Ypres 1914 '15, Bellewaarde, Arras 1917, Cambrai 1917, Somme 1918, St. Quentin, Pursuit to Mons

After amalgamation of 16th and 5th Lancers:

- Second World War: Kasserine, Fondouk, Kairouan, Bordj, Djebel Kournine, Tunis, Gromballa, Bou Ficha, North Africa 1942-43, Cassino II, Liri Valley, Monte Piccolo, Capture of Perugia, Arezzo, Advance to Florence, Argenta Gap, Traghetto, Italy 1944-45
- Wadi al Batin, Gulf 1991

17th/21st battle honours

Combined honours before amalgamation of 17th and 21st Lancers:

- Alma, Balaklava, Inkerman, Sevastopol, Central India, South Africa 1879, Khartoum, South Africa 1900-02
- First World War: Festubert, Somme 1916 '18, Morval, Cambrai 1917 '18, St. Quentin, Avre, Hazebrouck, Amiens, Pursuit to Mons, France and Flanders 1914-18, N.W. Frontier India 1915 '16

After amalgamation of 17th and 21st Lancers:

- Second World War: Tebourba Gap, Bou Arada, Kasserine, Thala, Fondouk, El Kourzia, Tunis, Hammam Lif, North Africa 1942-43, Cassino II, Monte Piccolo, Capture of Perugia, Advance to Florence, Argenta Gap, Fossa Cembalina, Italy 1944-45

Queen's Royal Lancers

After amalgamation of 16th/5th Lancers and the 17th/21st Lancers into the Queens' Royal Lancers:

- Al Basrah, Iraq 2003

== Alliances ==
- Canada - Lord Strathcona's Horse (Royal Canadians)
- Australia - 12th/16th Hunter River Lancers
- Royal Navy - HMS Ark Royal

=== Affiliated Yeomanry ===
- Sherwood Rangers

== Colonel-in-Chief ==
- 1993–2015: Queen Elizabeth II

== Regimental Colonels ==
Colonels of the regiment were:

- 1993–1995: Maj-Gen. Alastair Wesley Dennis, CB, OBE (ex 16/5 Lancers)
- 1995–2001: Lt-Gen. Sir Richard Swinburn, KCB
- 2001–2006: Brig. William James Hurrell, CBE
- 2006-2011: Maj-Gen. Andrew Cumming
- 2011-2015: Maj-Gen. Patrick Marriott, CB CBE

== Commanding Officers ==
Regimental Commanding Officers included:

- 1993–1994: Lieutenant Colonel Robert A. McKenzie Johnston
- 1994–1996: Lt Col Alick I. Finlayson
- 1996–1998: Lt Col Rudi N. Wertheim
- 1998–2000: Lt Col Patrick Claude Marriott
- 2000–2002: Lt Col James Rupert Everard
- 2002–2004: Lt Col Charles S. Fattorini
- 2004–2006: Lt Col Andrew G. Hughes
- 2006–2008: Lt Col Richard B. Nixon-Eckersall
- 2008–2011: Lt Col Martin Todd
- 2011–2013: Lt Col Nigel J. Best
- 2013–2015: Lt Col Julian N. E. Buczacki
