= Richard Swinburn =

British general (1937–2017)

Lieutenant General Sir Richard Swinburn KCB
- Born: 30 October 1937
- Died: 11 October 2017 (aged 79); Dummer, Hampshire
- Spouse(s): Jane Elise Brodie (m. 1964; died 2001) Susan Ferguson (m. 2012)
- Military career
- Allegiance: United Kingdom
- Branch: British Army
- Service years: 1957–1995
- Rank: Lieutenant General
- Commands: South East District; 1st Armoured Division; 7th Armoured Brigade; 17th/21st Lancers
- Awards: Knight Commander of the Order of the Bath

Lieutenant General Sir Richard Hull Swinburn, KCB (30 October 1937 – 11 October 2017) was a senior British Army officer who served as Commander of the UK Field Army from 1994 to 1995.

== Military career ==
Educated at Wellington College and the Royal Military College, Sandhurst, Swinburn was commissioned into the 17th/21st Lancers in 1957. He became commanding officer of the 17th/21st Lancers in 1979 and commander of the 7th Armoured Brigade in 1983. He went on to be General Officer Commanding (GOC) 1st Armoured Division in 1987 and Assistant Chief of the General Staff in 1989. He was made GOC South East District in 1990 (which was retitled Southern District in 1992). He was then made Commander UK Field Army in 1994, and retired in 1995.

Swinburn was given the colonelcy of the Queen's Royal Lancers from 1995 to 2001.

== Family ==
Swinburn was the son of Major General Henry Robinson Swinburn (1897–1981) and Naomi Hull (1903–1992). His maternal grandfather was Major General Sir Charles Hull and his uncle was Field Marshal Sir Richard Hull. In 1964 he married Jane Elise Brodie, who died in 2001. In September 2012, it was announced that he was engaged to Susan Ferguson (née Deptford), the widow of Major Ronald Ferguson and the stepmother of Sarah Ferguson. They married in December 2012. Prince Andrew, Sarah, Duchess of York, and their two daughters attended Sir Richard and Lady Swinburn's wedding celebrations.

Military offices
Preceded by Anthony Mullens	General Officer Commanding 1st Armoured Division; 1987–1989	Succeeded by Roger Wheeler
Preceded by Charles Guthrie	Assistant Chief of the General Staff; 1989–1990	Succeeded by Roger Wheeler
Preceded by Sir Peter de la Billière	General Officer Commanding South East District; 1990–1994	Succeeded by Sir Anthony Denison-Smith (AS GOC Southern District)
Preceded by Sir Michael Rose	Commander UK Field Army; 1994–1995	Succeeded by Sir Hew Pike
