= James Lunt =

British Army general and military historian (1917–2001)

Major-General James Dorian Lunt CBE (1917–2001) was a senior British Army officer and military historian. He was the author of Glubb Pasha (1984), Hussein of Jordan (1989) and Jai Sixth! (1994), a history of the 6th Gurkha Rifles.

== Biography ==
Lunt was born in Liverpool and educated at King William's College, Isle of Man and the Royal Military College, Sandhurst. Lunt was commissioned into the 2nd Battalion, The Duke of Wellington's Regiment and was posted to Multan, India, later serving in Amritsar. He transferred to the 4th Battalion, the Burma Rifles in 1939. He served in the Far East during the Second World War, taking part in the retreat from Burma in 1942. He later attended the Indian Military Academy at Dehra Dun. Lunt served with the 16th/5th Queen's Royal Lancers from 1949 to 1952 which included service in Egypt. He commanded an Arab armoured car regiment in Jordan from 1952 to 1955. Lunt later commanded his former regiment, the 16th/5th Queen's Royal Lancers, at Catterick, Yorkshire, at that time a training regiment. Lunt took over command of the Federal Regular Army in Aden in 1961 and remained in command to 1964. He served at the Ministry of Defence to 1966 when he was appointed defence adviser to the British High Commissioner of India. He was Chief of Staff of Contingency Planning at HQ SHAPE from 1969. Lunt's final military appointment was Vice-Adjutant General of the British Army from 1971 to 1973. He retired from the British Army in August 1973.

Lunt was colonel commandant of the 16th/5th Queen's Royal Lancers from 1975 to 1980. He was Domestic Bursar of Wadham College, University of Oxford, from 1973 to 1983. He was the author of biographies and books on military history including Glubb Pasha (1984), A Hell of a Licking: Retreat from Burma, 1941-42 (1986), Hussein of Jordan (1989), Scarlet Lancers: The story of the 16th/5th The Queen's Royal Lancers 1689–1992 (1993) and Jai Sixth! (1994), a history of the 6th Gurkha Rifles. He was awarded the OBE in 1958 and CBE in 1964.
