= 5th Royal Irish Lancers =

British Army cavalry regiment

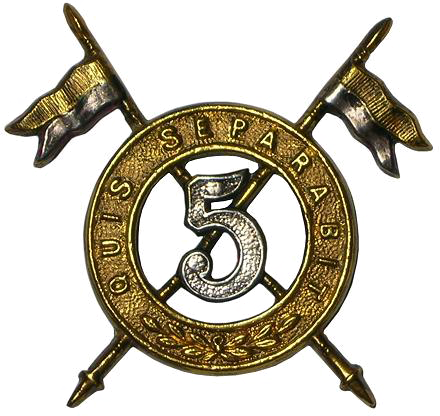
- Cap badge of the regiment
- Active: 1689–1799; 1858–1922
- Country: United Kingdom
- Branch: British Army
- Type: Cavalry
- Role: Line Cavalry
- Size: 1 Regiment
- Nickname: The Redbreasts
- Motto: Quis separabit (Who shall separate us?)
- March: Slow: Let Erin Remember, The Harp That Once Through Tara's Halls

Commanders
- Notable commanders: Field Marshal Richard Molesworth, 3rd Viscount Molesworth General Joseph Yorke, 1st Baron Dover; General Robert Cuninghame, 1st Baron Rossmore; Major General Thomas Arthur Cooke; Major-General Sir Henry Jenner Scobell Field Marshal Edmund Allenby, 1st Viscount Allenby

The 5th Royal Irish Lancers was a cavalry regiment of the British Army. It saw service for three centuries, including the First World War. It amalgamated with the 16th The Queen's Lancers to become the 16th/5th Lancers in 1922.

== History ==
=== Early wars ===
c. 1751 painting of a regimental private

The regiment was originally formed in 1689 by Brigadier James Wynne as James Wynne's Regiment of Dragoons. It fought at the Battle of the Boyne in July 1690 and at the Battle of Aughrim later that month under King William III. Renamed the Royal Dragoons of Ireland in 1704, it went on to fight under the Duke of Marlborough at the Battle of Blenheim in August 1704 during the War of the Spanish Succession. At the Battle of Ramillies in May 1706 the regiment helped capture the entire French "Regiment du Roi", after which it fought at the Battle of Oudenarde in July 1708 and at the Battle of Malplaquet in September 1709. In 1751, it was retitled 5th Regiment of Dragoons and in 1756 it became the 5th (or Royal Irish) Regiment of Dragoons. As such, it served in Ireland and had the honour of leading the charge against the rebels at the Battle of Enniscorthy in May 1798 during the Irish Rebellion of 1798. However, its troops were accused of treachery: their accusers claimed their ranks had been infiltrated by rebels. Following an investigation, it was found that a single individual, James M'Nassar, had infiltrated the regiment: he was ordered to be "transported beyond the seas". According to Continental Magazine:

The circumstance was commemorated in a curious way. It was ordered that the 5th Royal Irish Light Dragoons should be erased from the records of the army list, in which a blank between the 4th and 6th Dragoons should remain forever, as a memorial of disgrace. For upward of half a century this gap remained in the army list, as anybody may see by referring to any number of that publication of half-a-dozen years back.

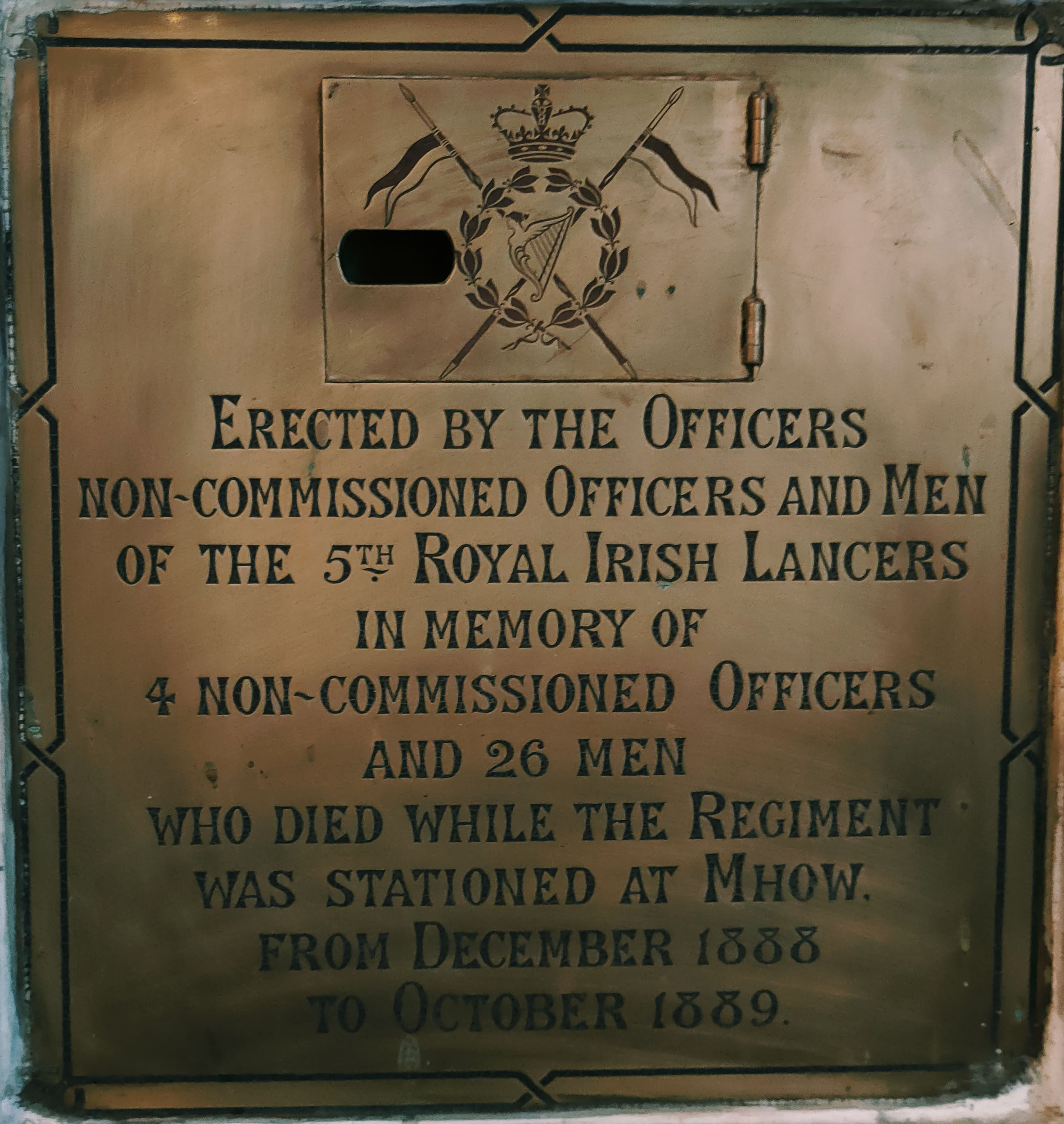
The 5th Royal Irish Lancers were stationed at Mhow between 1888 and 1889 and placed this brass plaque inside Christ Church, Mhow with a small built-in cabinet

The regiment was reformed in 1858, keeping its old number and title, but losing precedence, being ranked after the 17th Lancers. It was immediately converted into a lancer regiment and titled 5th (or Royal Irish) Regiment of Dragoons (Lancers). In 1861, it was renamed the 5th (or Royal Irish) Lancers and then the 5th (Royal Irish) Lancers. The regiment served in India between November 1863 and December 1874 and a contingent joined the Nile Expedition in autumn 1884. It then fought against the forces of Osman Digna near Suakin in 1885 during the Mahdist War. The regiment again left for India in November 1888, serving there for ten years until they were posted to South Africa in February 1898. They were stationed at Ladysmith until October 1898, when they went to Pietermaritzburg, where they remained until the outbreak of the Second Boer War in October 1899.

=== Second Boer War ===
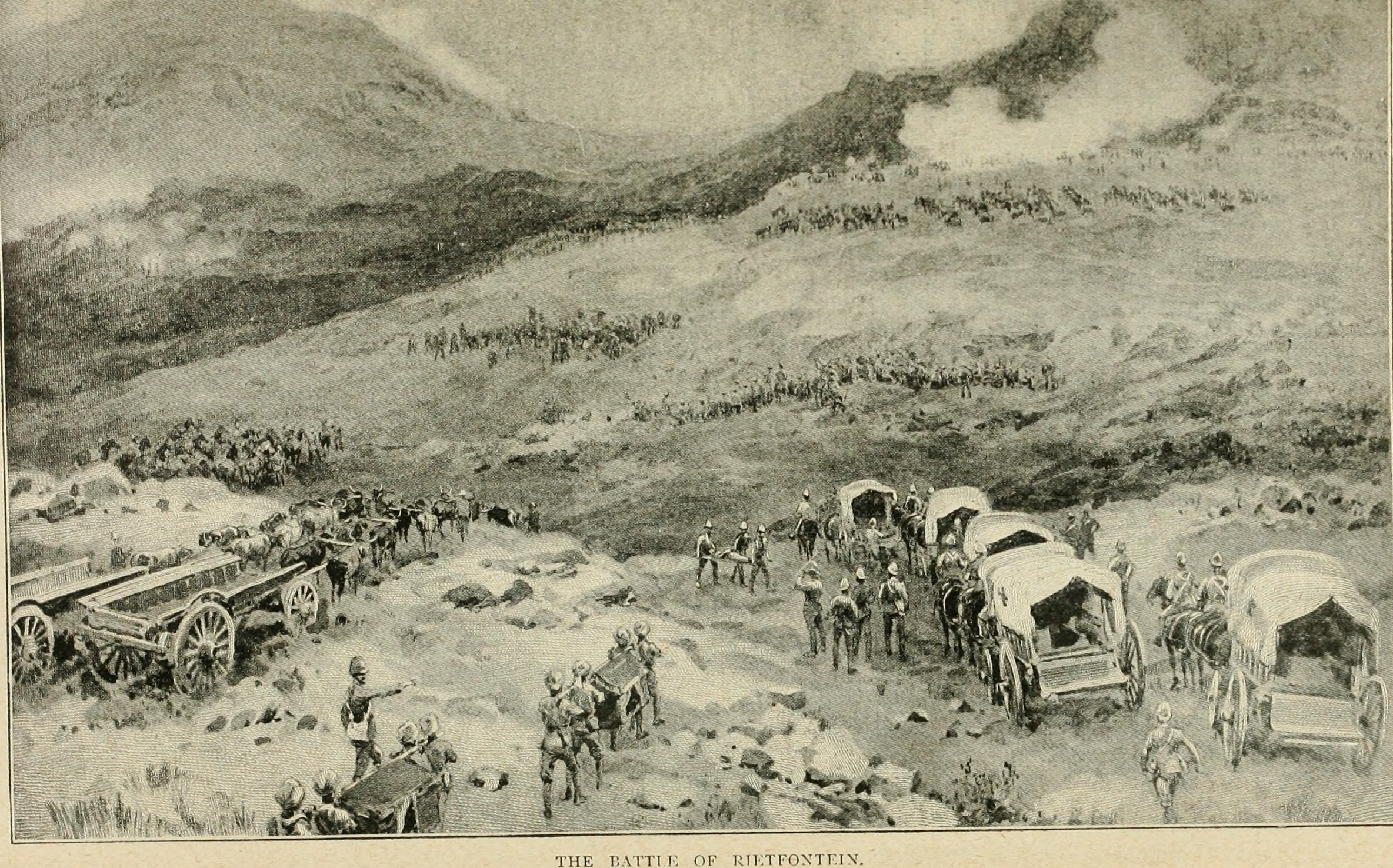
The Battle of Rietfontein on 24 October 1899 during the Second Boer War

As one of two cavalry regiments stationed in South Africa on the outbreak of war, the regiment consequently took part in the early fighting. They fought at the Battle of Elandslaagte on 21 October 1899, at the Battle of Rietfontein on 24 October 1899, and was part of the besieged garrison of Ladysmith during the Siege of Ladysmith November 1899 to February 1900. After the relief of that town, they were re-horsed, and formed part of General Sir Redvers Buller′s army, taking part in all his actions until his Natal army joined with the main army at Belfast. They accompanied Buller in his advance into the Lydenburg district, and then, under General John Brocklehurst, made the forced march through the Dulstroom Valley to join General Ian Hamilton. Later they formed part of General Smith-Dorrien′s flying column. In January 1901, still under General Smith-Dorrien, they covered the left of General Sir John French′s big movement down to the Swaziland border. They then served under General Sir Bindon Blood, and operated in the Carolina district until July 1901, when they travelled by rail to Cape Colony. Here they formed part of Colonel Hunter-Weston′s mobile column. The regiment thus stayed in South Africa throughout the hostilities, which ended with the Peace of Vereeniging on 31 May 1902. Following the end of the war, 340 officers and men of the regiment left South Africa on the SS City of Vienna, which arrived at Southampton in October 1902.

The regiment, as part of the 3rd Cavalry Brigade, was also involved in the Curragh incident in March 1914.

=== First World War ===
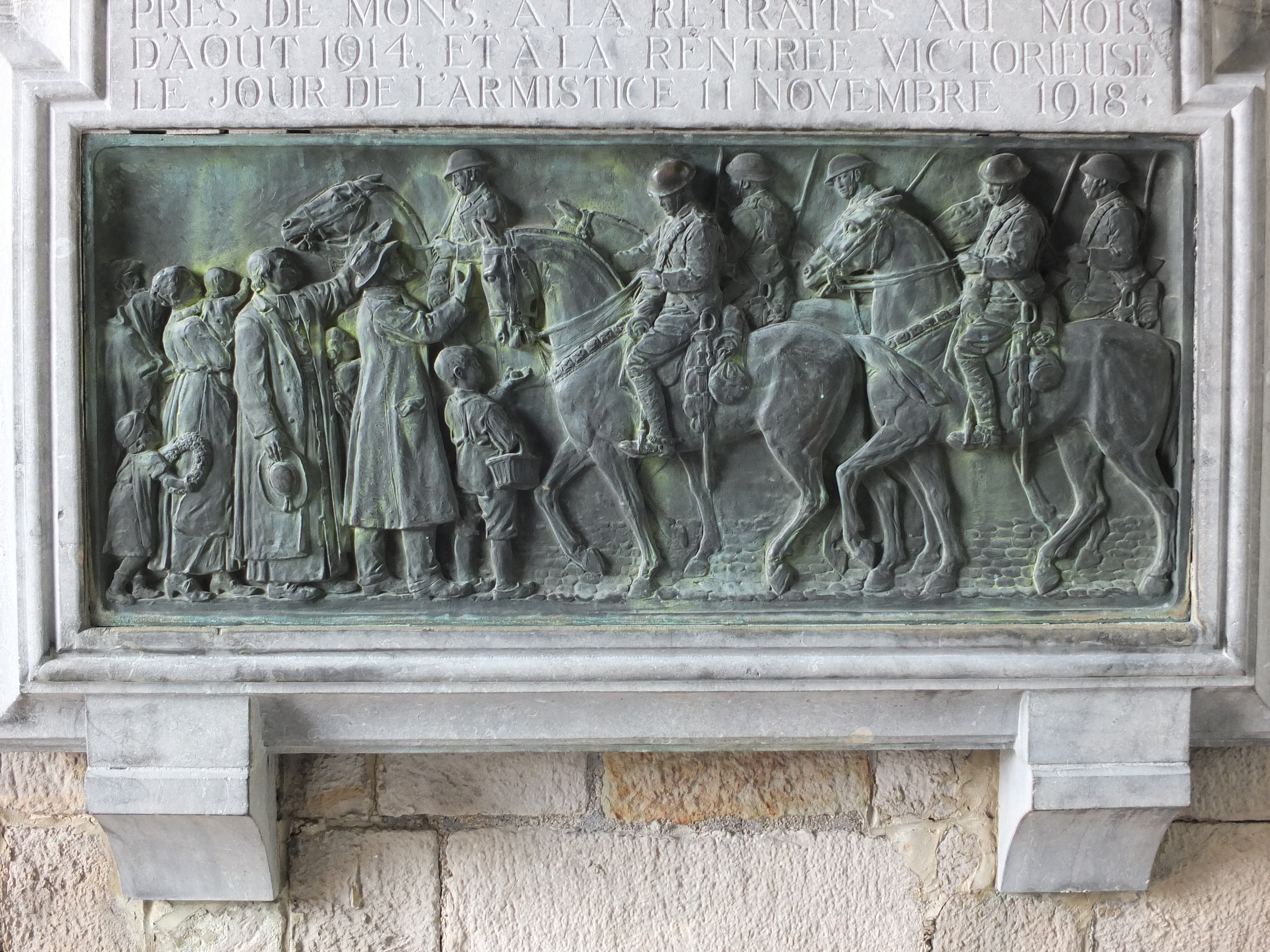
Sculpture at the town hall of Mons to commemorate the liberation of the city by the 5th Royal Irish Lancers on 11 November 1918

The regiment then returned to England, where it stayed until the outbreak of World War I, when it became part of the British Expeditionary Force, sailing from Dublin to France as part of the 3rd Cavalry Brigade in the 2nd Cavalry Division in August 1914 for service on the Western Front. It saw action during the Battle of Mons in August 1914. During the Battle of Cambrai in November 1917 George William Burdett Clare received the Victoria Cross posthumously. The 5th (Royal Irish) Lancers also has the grim honour of being the regiment of the last British soldier to die in the Great War. This was Private George Edwin Ellison from Leeds, who was killed by a sniper as the regiment advanced into Mons a short time before the armistice came into effect.

The regiment was renamed 5th Royal Irish Lancers and disbanded in 1921, but a squadron was reconstituted in 1922 and immediately amalgamated with the 16th The Queen's Lancers to become the 16th/5th Lancers.

== Regimental museum ==
The regimental collection is held at The Royal Lancers and Nottinghamshire Yeomanry Museum which is based at Thoresby Hall in Nottinghamshire.

== Battle honours ==
The regiment was awarded the following British battle honours:

- Early Wars: Blenheim, Ramillies, Oudenarde, Malplaquet, Suakin 1885, Defence of Ladysmith, South Africa 1899–1902
- The Great War: Mons, Le Cateau, Retreat from Mons, Marne 1914, Aisne 1914, Messines 1914, Ypres 1914, 1915, Gheluvelt, St. Julien / Bellewaarde, Arras 1917, Scarpe 1917, Cambrai 1917, Somme 1918, St. Quentin, Amiens, Hindenburg Line, Canal du Nord, Pursuit to Mons, France and Flanders 1914–18

== Victoria Crosses ==
- Private George William Burdett Clare - First World War, 28–29 November 1917
- Lieutenant Frederic Brooks Dugdale - Second Boer War, 3 March 1901

== Regimental Colonels ==
Colonels of the Regiment were:

James Wynne's Regiment of Dragoons

- 1689–1695: Brig-Gen. James Wynne

Royal Dragoons of Ireland (1704)

- 1695–1715: Gen. Hon. Charles Ross
- 1715–1729: Col. Hon. Thomas Sydney
- 1729–1732: Gen. Hon. Charles Ross (reappointed)
- 1732–1737: Lt-Gen. Owen Wynne
- 1737–1758: F.M. Richard Molesworth, 3rd Viscount Molesworth

5th (or Royal Irish) Regiment of Dragoons

- 1758–1760: Gen. John Mostyn
- 1760–1787: Gen. Hon. Sir Joseph Yorke, 1st Baron Dover, KB
- 1787–1799: Gen. The Rt. Hon. Robert Cuninghame, 1st Baron Rossmore, PC
- 1799: Regiment disbanded at Chatham
- 1858: Regiment re-formed

5th (or Royal Irish) Regiment of Dragoons (Lancers)

- 1858–1868: Gen. Sir James Charles Chatterton, Bt., GCB, KH

5th (Royal Irish) Lancers

- 1868–1872: Gen. Edward Pole
- 1872–1887: Gen. Henry Darby Griffith, CB
- 1887–1892: Lt-Gen. Sir Somerset Gough-Calthorpe, 7th Baron Calthorpe, KCB
- 1892–1896: Lt-Gen. Hon. Charles Wemyss Thesiger
- 1896–1906: Lt-Gen. William Godfrey Dunham Massy, CB
- 1906–1908: Maj-Gen. Thomas Arthur Cooke, CVO
- 1908–1912: Maj-Gen. Sir Henry Jenner Scobell, KCVO, CB
- 1912–1921: F.M. Sir Edmund Henry Hynman Allenby, 1st Viscount Allenby, GCB, GCMG, GCVO (to 16th/5th Lancers).
- 1921: Regiment disbanded
- 1922: Regiment re-formed and amalgamated with the 16th The Queen's Lancers to form the 16th/5th Lancers

== See also ==
- British cavalry during the First World War

== Sources ==
- Willcox, Major Walter Temple (1908). The Historical Records of the Fifth (Royal Irish) Lancers from their Foundation as Wynne’s Dragoons (in 1689) to 1908. Arthur Doubleday. OCLC 11991270.
