= 16th/5th The Queen's Royal Lancers =

- Active: 1922–1993
- Country: United Kingdom
- Branch: British Army
- Type: Line Cavalry
- Size: Regiment
- Part of: Royal Armoured Corps

Commanders
- Colonel-in-Chief: The Queen

The 16th/5th The Queen's Royal Lancers was a cavalry regiment of the British Army. It was formed by the amalgamation of the 16th The Queen's Lancers and the 5th Royal Irish Lancers in 1922. The reason for the uniquely atypical regimental title (with a higher number preceding a lower) was that the 5th had been re-raised in 1858 almost 60 years after being disbanded, and when re-raised took precedence after the 17th Lancers. After service in the Second World War and the Gulf War, the regiment amalgamated with the 17th/21st Lancers to form the Queen's Royal Lancers in 1993.

== History ==
=== India 1922 to 1939 ===
The regiment was formed at Lucknow in India by the amalgamation of the 16th The Queen's Lancers and the 5th Royal Irish Lancers on 11 April 1922.

=== Second World War ===
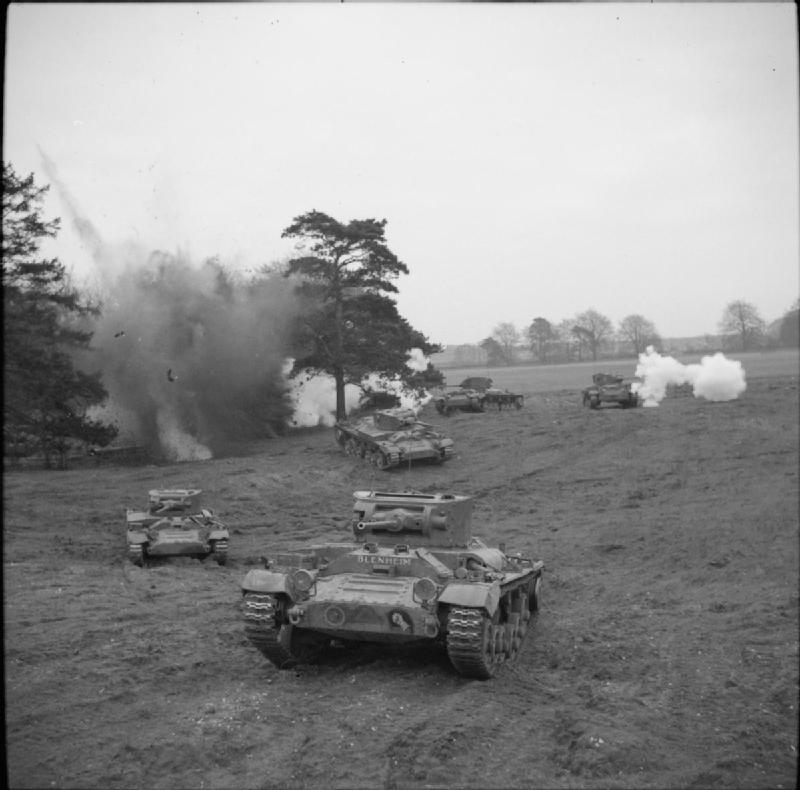
Valentine tanks of 16th/5th Lancers training near Brandon in Northumberland, 9 December 1941.

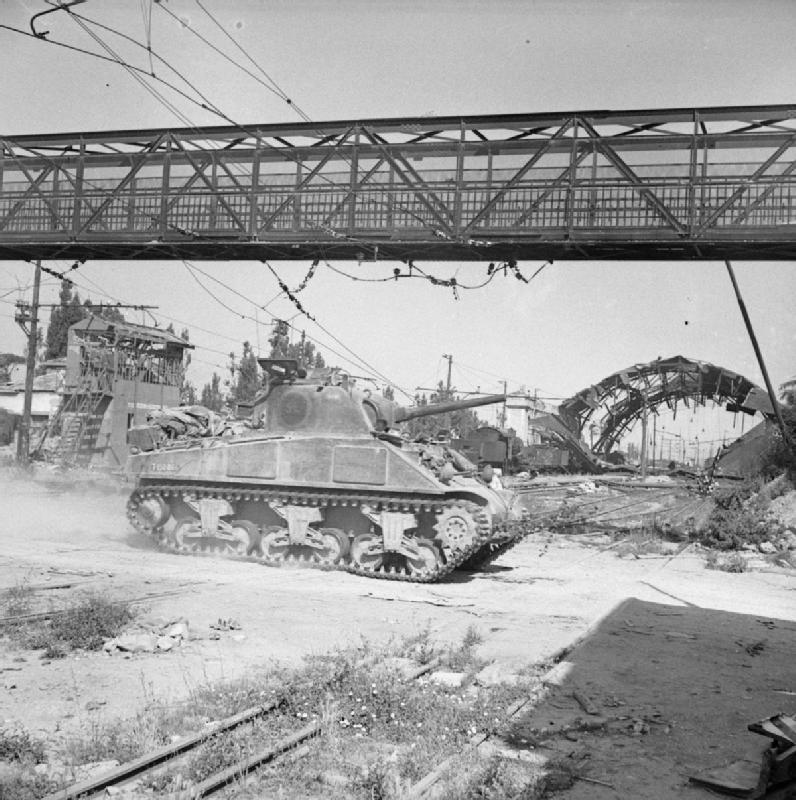
An M4 Sherman tank of the 16th/5th The Queen's Royal Lancers passes through a railway yard at Arezzo, Italy, 15–16 July 1944.

It was in India when the Second World War started. The regiment returned to the United Kingdom in 1940, becoming part of 26th Armoured Brigade in the 6th Armoured Division. As part of this formation, the regiment fought at the Battle of Kasserine Pass in February 1943 and the Siege of Tunis in May 1943, before landing in Naples in January 1944 and taking part in the Battle of Monte Cassino in May 1944.

=== Post-war ===
The regiment was posted to Flug Marine Barracks in Schleswig at the end of the war but moved to Lulworth Camp in late 1946. Princess Elizabeth became Colonel-in-Chief of the regiment in 1947, and after her accession to the throne, the regiment was retitled the 16th/5th The Queen's Royal Lancers, in 1954. The regiment was deployed to Egypt in March 1948 and to Libya in February 1950. It re-roled as an anti-tank regiment with 33rd Armoured Brigade based Athlone Barracks in Sennelager in July 1953 before moving to Waithwith Camp at Catterick Garrison in February 1957. It joined 12th Infantry Brigade and moved to Imphal Barracks in Osnabrück in April 1959.

The regiment deployed squadrons to Aden and to Hong Kong in November 1963 and then re-roled as a tank regiment at Aliwal Barracks in Tidworth Camp in December 1964. It joined 11th Infantry Brigade and moved to Lumsden Barracks at Bad Fallingbostel in January 1968. It became resident battalion at Lisanelly Camp in Omagh in November 1971 at the height of the Troubles and then returned to Aliwal Barracks in Tidworth in May 1973. From there it deployed squadrons to Cyprus and to Hong Kong. It returned to West Germany in a recce role and took up residence at Northampton Barracks in Wolfenbüttel in October 1974. From there it deployed units to Northern Ireland again.

In November 1980 the regiment moved to Bovington Camp as RAC Centre Regiment and, in January 1983, it moved on to Assaye Barracks at Tidworth as recce regiment for 1st Infantry Brigade deploying units for peace keeping duties to Beirut in December 1983 and to Cyprus in January 1984 and January 1985. It became recce regiment for 4th Armoured Division based at Harewood Barracks in Herford in November 1986 and deployed to the Persian Gulf in December 1990 for the Gulf War. Its final role was as recce regiment for 19th Infantry Brigade based at Carver Barracks at Debden in July 1991. From there it deployed units to Cyprus.

In 1993, as part of the reduction in forces after the end of the Cold War, it amalgamated with the 17th/21st Lancers to form the Queen's Royal Lancers.

== Battle honours ==
Battle honours were:

For battle honours won by predecessor regiments see 16th The Queen's Lancers and 5th Royal Irish Lancers.

- Second World War: Kasserine, Fondouk, Kairouan, Bordj, Djebel Kournine, Tunis, Gromballa, Bou Ficha, North Africa 1942–43, Cassino II, Liri Valley, Monte Piccolo, Capture of Perugia, Arezzo, Advance to Florence, Argenta Gap, Traghetto, Italy 1944–45
- Gulf War: Gulf 1991

== Commanding Officers ==
The Commanding Officers have been:

- 1959–1961: Lt.-Col. Robert A. Simpson
- 1961–1964: Lt.-Col. Peter C. Bull
- 1964–1966: Lt.-Col. Peter J. Holland
- 1966–1969: Lt.-Col. Henry A. G. Brooke
- 1969–1971: Lt.-Col. John L. Pownall
- 1971–1974: Lt.-Col. Alistair W. Dennis
- 1974–1976: Lt.-Col. Richard Q. M. Morris
- 1976–1979: Lt.-Col. Hon. Nicholas C. L. Vivian
- 1979–1982: Lt.-Col. Charles J. Radford
- 1982–1984: Lt.-Col. John A. Wright
- 1984–1986: Lt.-Col. Derek M. O’Callaghan
- 1986–1989: Lt.-Col. Mark F. C. Radford
- 1989–1991: Lt.-Col. Philip E. Scott
- 1991–1993: Lt.-Col. Peter M. Campbell

== Colonels-in-Chief ==
- 1922–1941: Field Marshal HM King Alfonso XIII of Spain, KG GCVO
- 1947–1993: HM The Queen

== Regimental Colonels ==
Colonels of the regiment were:

16th/5th Lancers

- 1922–1936 (16th Lancers): Lt-Gen. Sir James Melville Babington, KCB, KCMG (ex 16th Lancers)
- 1922–1936 (5th Lancers): F.M. Sir Edmund Henry Hynman Allenby, 1st Viscount Allenby, GCB, GCMG, GCVO (ex 5th Royal Irish Lancers)
- 1936–1943: Gen. Sir Hubert de la Poer Gough, GCB, GCMG, KCVO
- 1943–1950: Col. Henry Cecil Lloyd Howard, CB, CMG, DSO
- 1950–1959: Brig. Philip Ernest Bowden-Smith, CBE

16th/5th The Queen's Royal Lancers (1954)

- 1959–1969: Col. Dennis Douglas Pilkington Smyly, DSO
- 1969–1975: Lt-Col. Anthony Stanley Bullivant, MBE
- 1975–1980: Maj-Gen. James Dorian Lunt, CBE
- 1980–1985: Col. Henry Arthur Gunning Brooke, MC
- 1985–1990: Brig. John Lionel Pownall, OBE
- 1990–1993: Maj-Gen. Alastair Wesley Dennis, CB, OBE (to The Queen's Royal Lancers)
- 1993: Regiment amalgamated with 17th/21st Lancers to form The Queen's Royal Lancers

== See also ==
- The Royal Lancers and Nottinghamshire Yeomanry Museum

Preceded by 16th The Queen's Lancers; 5th Royal Irish Lancers	16th/5th The Queen's Royal Lancers; 1922–1993	Succeeded by The Queen's Royal Lancers
