= 16th The Queen's Lancers =

British Army cavalry regiment

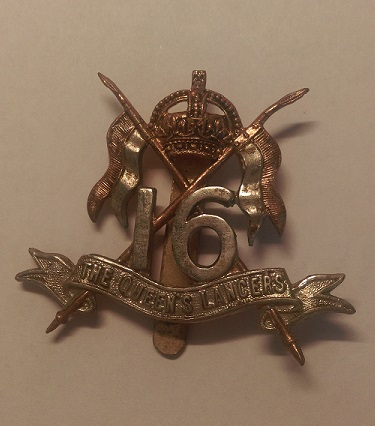
- Cap badge of the regiment
- Active: 1759–1922
- Country: Kingdom of Great Britain (1759–1800); United Kingdom (1801–1922)
- Branch: British Army
- Type: Line Cavalry
- Size: Regiment
- Nickname: "The Scarlet Lancers"
- Mottos: Aut cursu, aut cominus armis (Either in the charge or in hand-to-hand combat)
- March: Quick: The English Patrol; Slow: The 16th Lancers
- Anniversaries: Aliwal (28 January)

Commanders
- Notable commanders: General John Burgoyne Field Marshal William Harcourt, 3rd Earl Harcourt General Sir Edward Cust

The 16th The Queen's Lancers was a cavalry regiment of the British Army, first raised in 1759. It saw service for two centuries, before being amalgamated with the 5th Royal Irish Lancers to form the 16th/5th Lancers in 1922.

== History ==
=== Early wars ===
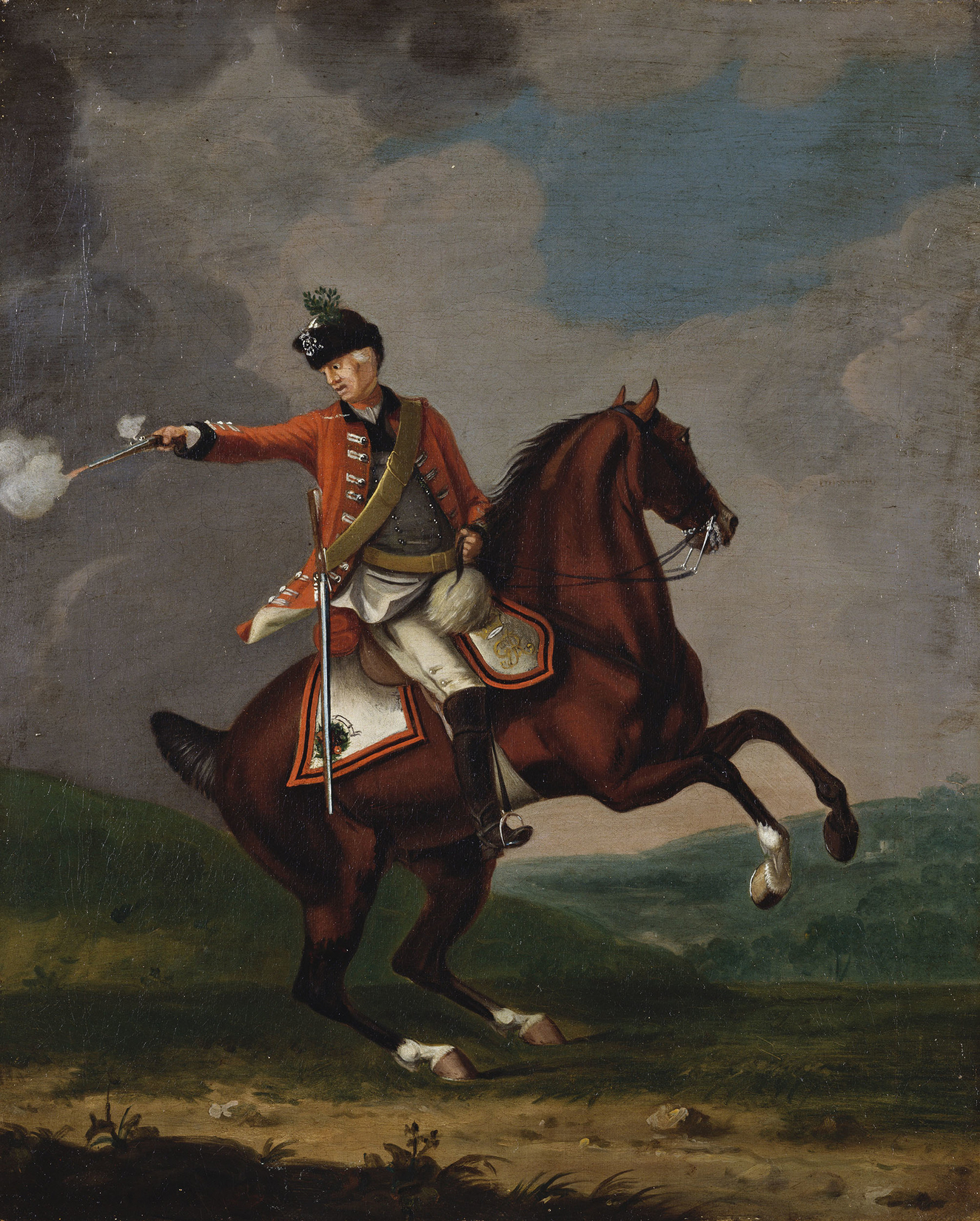
1760 painting of a regimental private

The regiment was raised in 1759 by Colonel John Burgoyne as the 16th Regiment of (Light) Dragoons, being the second of the new regiments of light dragoons; it was also known as Burgoyne's Light Horse. The regiment was closely involved, undertaking several cavalry charges, in the action leading up to the capture of the French Garrison of Belle Île in April 1761 during the Seven Years' War. It also made a major contribution to the British victories against the Spaniards at the Battle of Valencia de Alcántara in August 1762 and at the Battle of Vila Velha in October 1762 during the Anglo-Spanish War. In 1766 the regiment was renamed after Queen Charlotte as the 2nd (or The Queen's) Regiment of (Light) Dragoons, the number being an attempt to create a new numbering system for the light dragoon regiments. However, the old system was quickly re-established, with the regiment returning as the 16th (The Queen's) Regiment of (Light) Dragoons in 1769. The regiment arrived in New York in October 1776 for service in the American Revolutionary War. It was involved in fighting at the Battle of White Plains in October 1776, the Battle of Brandywine in September 1777 and the Battle of Germantown in October 1777 before seeing more action at the Battle of Crooked Billet in May 1778, the Battle of Barren Hill later that month and the Battle of Monmouth in June 1778. The regiment returned to England in spring 1779. The regiment next landed at Ostend in April 1793 for service in the Flanders Campaign and was present at the siege of Valenciennes in June 1793, the siege of Dunkirk in August 1793 and the siege of Landrecies in April 1794. It also took part in the Battle of Beaumont in April 1794, the Battle of Willems in May 1794 and the Battle of Tournay in later that month before returning to England in February 1796. The regiment was then based in Ireland between autumn 1802 and 1805.

=== Napoleonic Wars ===
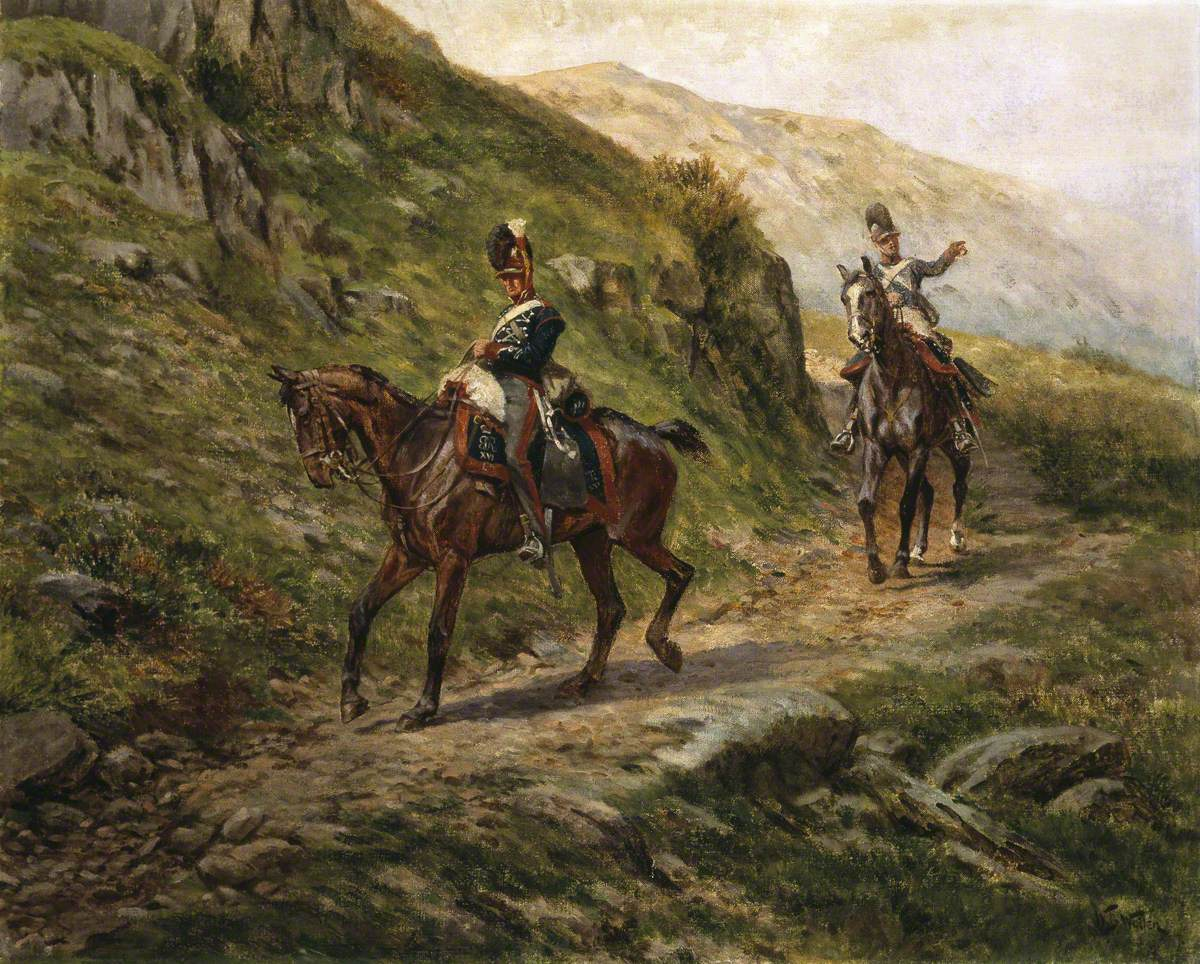
Painting of a regimental officer and trooper in Spain in 1809

The regiment were ordered to support Sir Arthur Wellesley's Army on the Iberian Peninsula and landed at Lisbon in April 1809. The regiment fought at the Second Battle of Porto in May 1809, the Battle of Talavera in July 1809 and the siege of Ciudad Rodrigo in April 1810. The regiment also saw action at the Battle of Bussaco in September 1810 the Battle of Sabugal in April 1811 and the Battle of Fuentes de Oñoro in May 1811. It next fought at the Battle of Salamanca in July 1812, the siege of Burgos in September 1812 and the Battle of Vitoria in June 1813. It was next in action at the siege of San Sebastián in August 1813 and having advanced into France, at the Battle of Nivelle in November 1813 and at the Battle of the Nive in December 1813. It returned home in July 1814.

The regiment took part in the Hundred Days landing at Ostend in May 1815. It charged with John Vandeleur's Cavalry Brigade at the Battle of Waterloo in June 1815. After the battle, their commander, Lieutenant-Colonel James Hay, lay so badly injured that he could not be moved from the field for eight days. The regiment had been the sole British cavalry regiment to serve throughout the Peninsular War and at the Hundred Days.

=== Victorian era ===
The regiment was dispatched to Ireland in March 1816 where it was re-designated as a lancer regiment in September 1816, becoming the 16th (The Queen's) Regiment of (Light) Dragoons (Lancers). It returned from Ireland in June 1819. The regiment was sent to India in 1822 and saw action, using lances, against the Marathas at the siege of Bharatpur in January 1826. It saw action again at the capture of Ghuznee in July 1839 during the First Anglo-Afghan War and at the Battle of Maharajpore in December 1843 during the Gwalior campaign. It also took part in the Battle of Aliwal in January 1846, when the regiment charged and dispersed a body of Sikhs ten times its size, and also fought at the Battle of Sobraon in February 1846 during the First Anglo-Sikh War. The regiment's title was simplified to the 16th (The Queen's) Lancers in 1861. It served in India between 1865 and 1876 and again between 1890 and 1899.

=== 20th century ===
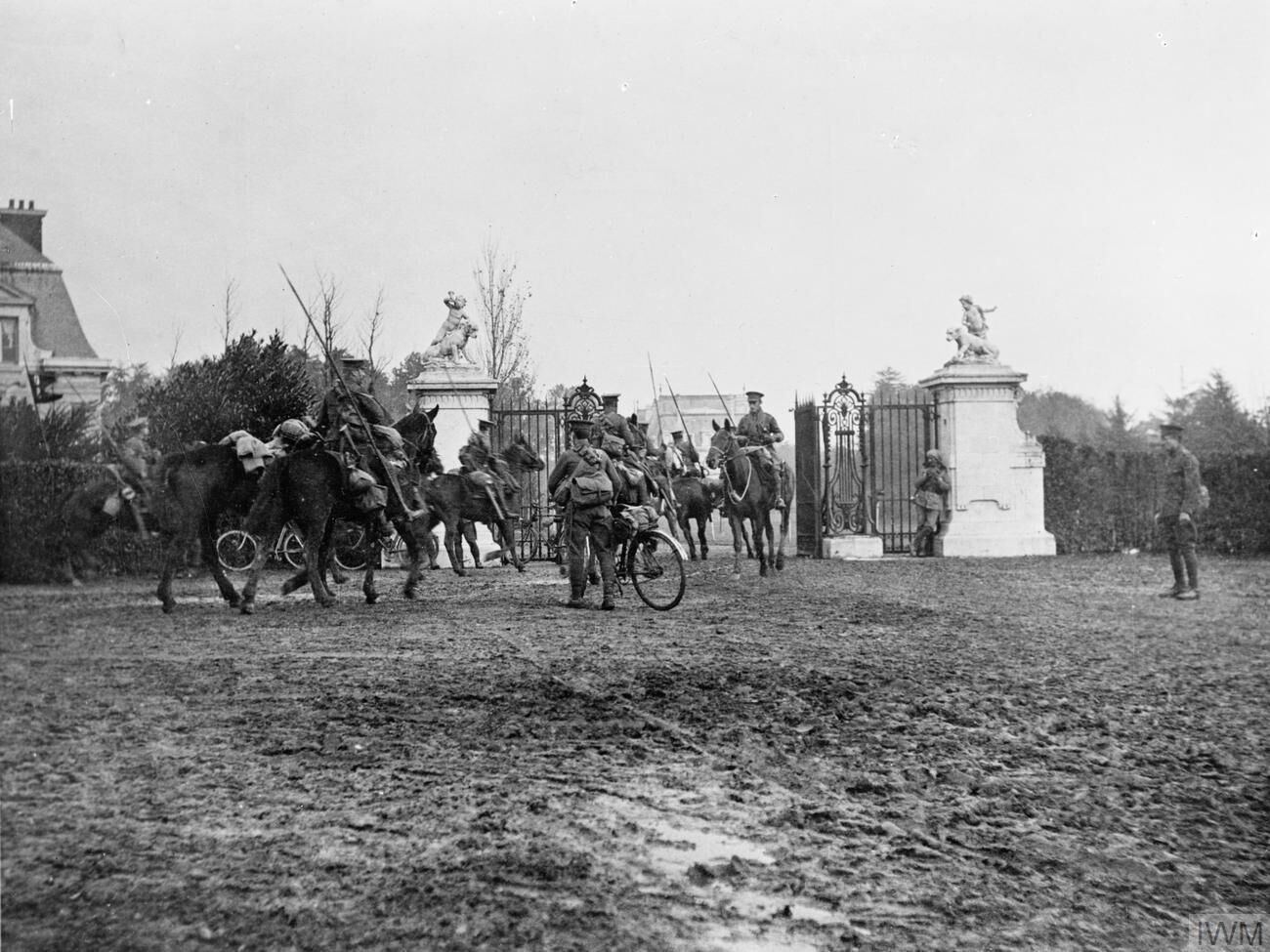
Regimental soldiers in Hollebeke, October 1914

The regiment landed at Cape Colony in January 1900 for service in the Second Boer War and took part in the relief of Kimberley in February 1900. The regiment, which had been based at The Curragh at the start of the First World War, landed in France as part of the 3rd Cavalry Brigade in the 1st Cavalry Division in August 1914 for service on the Western Front. The regiment was retitled as the 16th The Queen's Lancers in 1921 and amalgamated with the 5th Royal Irish Lancers to form the 16th/5th Lancers) in 1922.

== Regimental museum ==
The regimental collection is held at The Royal Lancers and Nottinghamshire Yeomanry Museum which is based at Thoresby Hall in Nottinghamshire.

== Insignia and uniform ==
The collar badge of the regiment comprised the figure 16 above a scroll inscribed "Queen's Lancers", over a pair of crossed lances and surmounted by a crown. The lancer full dress cap bore the regimental battle honours and number in silver.

In its early years as the 16th Light Dragoons, the regiment wore the standard red uniform of this branch of cavalry with black and then royal blue facings. In 1784 the red coat was replaced by a dark blue jacket. From 1816 to 1832 a dark blue lancer uniform was worn, until in December 1832 a scarlet coatee and undress jacket was authorized for all lancer regiments as part of a general policy to make red the national military colour. In 1840 it was ordered that Light Cavalry should revert to the blue uniforms formerly worn. Sir John Vandeleur petitioned that the regiment might be permitted to retain their scarlet coatee and on 2 March 1841, his request was granted. The scarlet uniform was worn by the regiment during the First Sikh War and on their return to England in 1846, they remained the only Lancer regiment not to resume the blue jacket of the light cavalry. The unique distinction of scarlet lancer tunic and dark blue plastron was retained in full dress until 1914.

== Battle honours ==
The regiment's battle honours were as follows:

- Early Wars: Beaumont, Willems, Talavera, Fuentes d'Onor, Salamanca, Vittoria, Nive, Peninsula, Waterloo, Bhurtpore, Ghuznee 1839, Afghanistan 1839, Maharajpore, Aliwal, Sobraon, Relief of Kimberley, Paardeberg, South Africa 1900–02.
- The Great War: Mons, Le Cateau, Retreat from Mons, Marne 1914, Aisne 1914, Messines 1914, Armentières 1914, Ypres 1914 '15, Gheluvelt, St. Julien, Bellewaarde, Arras 1917, Scarpe 1917, Cambrai 1917, Somme 1918, Amiens, Hindenburg Line, Canal du Nord, Pursuit to Mons, France and Flanders 1914–18.

== Victoria Cross ==
- Lieutenant The Viscount Fincastle – Tirah Campaign, 17 August 1897

== Colonel-in-Chief ==
- 1905–: F.M. HM Alfonso XIII, King of Spain, KG, GCVO

== Regimental Colonels ==
Colonels of the Regiment were:

16th Regiment of (Light) Dragoons

- 1763–1779: Lt-Gen. John Burgoyne

16th (or The Queen's) Regiment of (Light) Dragoons (1769)

- 1779–1830: F.M. William Harcourt, 3rd Earl Harcourt, GCB

16th (The Queen's) Regiment of (Light) Dragoons (Lancers) (1816)

- 1830–1849: Gen. Sir John Ormsby Vandeleur, GCB
- 1849–1859: Lt-Gen. Sir Joseph Thackwell, GCB, KH
- 1859–1878: Gen. Hon. Sir Edward Cust, Bt., KCH

16th (or Queen's) Lancers

- 1878–1886: Gen. Sir Charles Cameron Shute, KCB
- 1886–1896: Gen. Sir Charles John Foster, KCB
- 1896–1909: Lt-Gen. William Thomas Dickson

16th (The Queen's) Lancers (1905) then 16th The Queen's Lancers (1921)

- 1909–1922: Lt-Gen. Sir James Melville Babington, KCB, KCMG (to 16th/5th Lancers)
- 1922: Regiment amalgamated with 5th Royal Irish Lancers to form the 16th/5th Lancers

== See also ==
- British cavalry during the First World War

== Sources ==
- Bromley, Janet; Bromley, David (2015). Wellington's Men Remembered Volume 2: A Register of Memorials to Soldiers who Fought in the Peninsular War and at Waterloo- Volume II: M to Z. Pen and Sword. ISBN 978-1-4738-5768-1.
- Carman, W.Y. Uniforms of the British Army – the Cavalry Regiments. Webb & Bower. ISBN 0-906671-13-2.
- Cannon, Richard (1842). Historical record of the Sixteenth Regiment or the Queen's Regiment of Light Dragoons, Lancers containing an account of the formation of the regiment in 1759 and of its subsequent services to 1841. John W. Parker.
- Dalton, Charles (1904). The Waterloo roll call. With biographical notes and anecdotes. London: Eyre and Spottiswoode.
- Sumner, Rev. Percy (1949). Yeomanry Cavalry Uniforms. Vol. 27. Journal of the Society for Army Historical Research.
