= The Royal Lancers and Nottinghamshire Yeomanry Museum =

The Royal Lancers & Nottinghamshire Yeomanry Museum
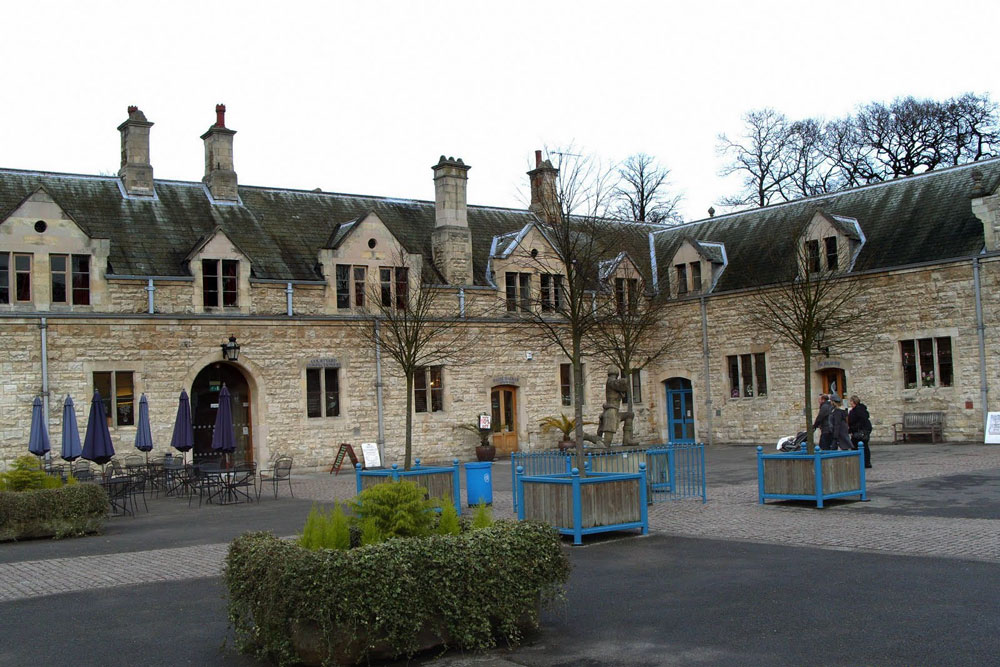

- Shown in Nottinghamshire
- Established: 2011
- Coordinates: 53.2349°N 1.0451°W
- Type: Military Museum
- Curator: Captain Mick Holtby
- Website: www.qrlnymuseum.co.uk

The Royal Lancers & Nottinghamshire Yeomanry Museum traces the history of three old and famous cavalry regiments, the Royal Lancers, the Sherwood Rangers Yeomanry and the South Nottinghamshire Hussars. It is located at Thoresby Hall in Nottinghamshire.

== History ==
The collection has its origins in the Queen's Royal Lancers Regimental Museum which was established at Belvoir Castle in 1964. After the lease at Belvoir Castle expired in October 2007, the trustees of the collection sought funding from the Heritage Lottery Fund to finance a move to Thoresby Hall where the Stonebridge Trust, which manages the courtyard there, offered a 25-year lease. Princess Alexandra opened The Queen's Royal Lancers and Nottinghamshire Yeomanry museum at Thoresby Hall in July 2011.

In November 2023, thieves stole a haul of "priceless" silver military antiques by cutting through the museum's floor. Among the items stolen from the museum are a distinctive parcel and gilt rosewater dish - said to be the sister piece to the Wimbledon women's singles trophy.

== Collection ==
The collection focusses on the role the local regiments played in warfare over the last 300 years. A highlight of the collection is the bugle which was used at the charge of the Light Brigade during the Crimean War.
