= 17th/21st Lancers =

- Cap badge of the regiment
- Active: 1922–1993
- Country: United Kingdom
- Branch: British Army
- Type: Cavalry of the Line/Royal Armoured Corps
- Role: Light Cavalry
- Size: 550 men
- Regimental Headquarters: Grantham
- Nickname: The Death or Glory Boys
- Motto: Death or Glory
- March: The White Lancers

Commanders
- Colonel-in-Chief: Princess Alexandra, The Honourable Lady Ogilvy

The 17th/21st Lancers was a cavalry regiment of the British Army. It was formed in England by the amalgamation of the 17th Lancers and the 21st Lancers in 1922 and, after service in the Second World War, it amalgamated with the 16th/5th The Queen's Royal Lancers to form the Queen's Royal Lancers in 1993.

== History ==
=== 1922 to 1939 ===
The regiment was formed in England during the interwar period by the amalgamation of the 17th Lancers and the 21st Lancers on 27 June 1922. It was deployed to Meerut in India in 1936 and it was mechanised in 1938.

=== Second World War ===
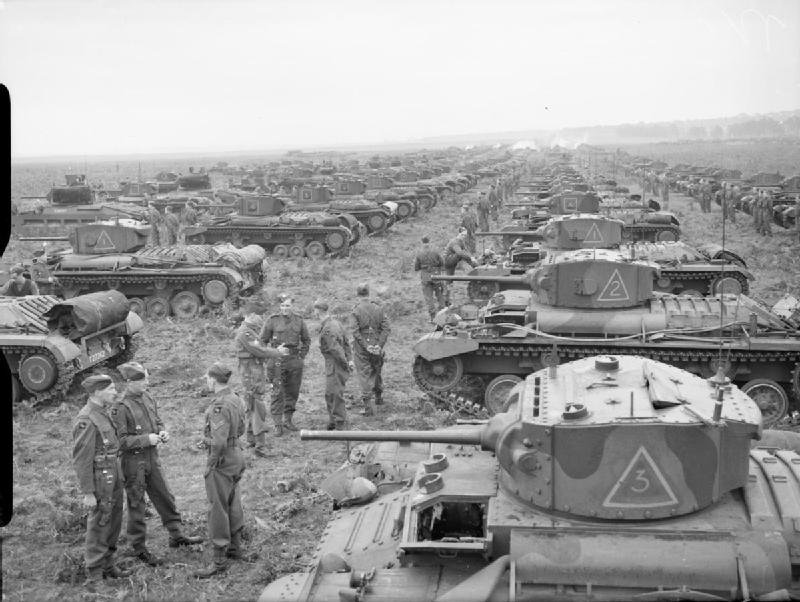
Valentine tanks of the 17th/21st Lancers near Brandon in Suffolk, England, 12 September 1941.

On the outbreak of the Second World War, in September 1939, the regiment transferred back to the United Kingdom and became part of the 1st Motor Machine Gun Brigade defending south-east England. On 12 October 1940, the 1st Motor Machine Gun Brigade became the 26th Armoured Brigade. On 9 November 1940, the brigade became part of the newly raised 6th Armoured Division, with which it served for the rest of the war. Some personnel from the regiment were detached in December to help form the cadre of the 24th Lancers.

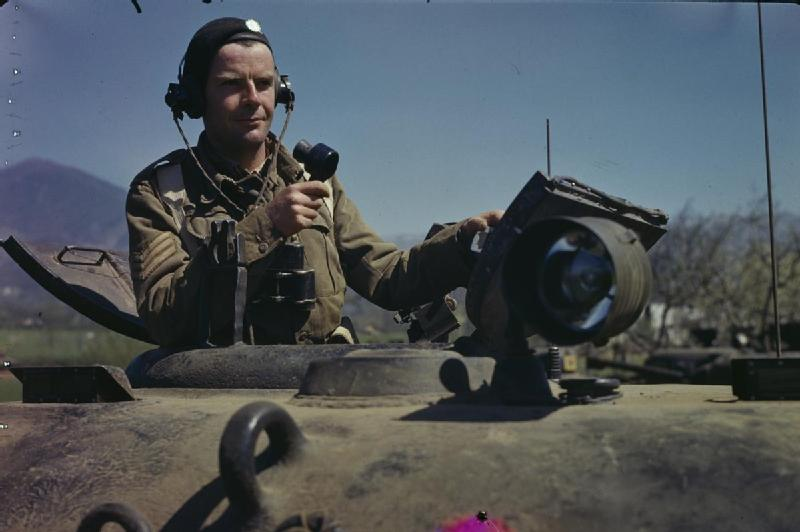
Sergeant A G Williams of the 17th/21st Lancers in the turret of his Sherman tank in the San Angelo area of Italy, April 1944.

In November 1942, the division was deployed to Tunisia for Operation Torch. Now equipped with Valentine Mk III and Crusader Mk III tanks, the regiment saw action in the Tunisia Campaign for some time, including taking heavy losses defending Thala in the Battle of Kasserine Pass in February 1943 during which fourteen tanks were put out of action. Despite these losses the pass was held and the Germans retreated. After the losses during this battle, the regiment was withdrawn from the front line. The Valentine tanks they were using were inferior to the German counterparts in both armour and weaponry, so the lancers were refitted with M4A2 Sherman tanks that carried a 75mm main gun. In April, the regiment attempted to take the Fondouk Pass during which thirty-two tanks were put out of action. Although this left the regiment with only a handful of tanks, it allowed command to send in the 16th/5th Lancers, and the pass was taken. The campaign in Tunisia came to an end in May 1943, with the capture of the Cap Bon Peninsula. The Germans were trying to delay its capture long enough to allow evacuation of their Army by sea. The Regiment conducted a 'charge' along the beach totally out manoeuvring the German defensive positions. Enemy resistance crumbled, with the surrender of thousands of German and Italian soldiers who subsequently became prisoners of war (POWs). Most of the 6th Armoured Division (minus the 1st Guards Brigade) then deployed to the Italian Front in March 1944, and fought to breach the Gustav Line, taking part in Operation Diadem, the fourth and final Battle of Monte Cassino. The regiment advanced to the Gothic Line, and spent the winter there—at points, serving as infantry rather than as an armoured unit, due to the static nature of the trench warfare there. After the final breakthrough in April 1945, codenamed Operation Grapeshot, the regiment ended the war in Austria.

=== Post-war activity ===
In October 1946, the regiment was posted to Greece on internal security duties and famine relief. In October 1947, it deployed to the Suez Canal Zone and re-equipped as an armoured car regiment; it then moved to Palestine in 1948. At the time Palestine was in a state of civil war, with both Jews and Arabs fighting for independence both from each other and British rule. The Regiment was involved in the operation of armoured rail cars, frontier patrols and escort duties. The regiment returned home to Catterick Garrison later that year as RAC Training Regiment and then joined 20th Armoured Brigade and moved to York Barracks at Münster in December 1951. It transferred to 4th Guards Brigade Group and moved to Barker Barracks in Paderborn in August 1957. After briefly returning home in December 1959, it moved to Hong Kong in March 1960 from where it deployed units to Aden in October 1961.

The regiment joined 20th Armoured Brigade Group and moved to Athlone Barracks at Sennelager in December 1962. After that it moved to Lisanelly Camp in Omagh in March 1968 from where it deployed a squadron to Libya in 1970. It then transferred to 4th Armoured Brigade and moved to Northampton Barracks in Wolfenbüttel in November 1972 from where it deployed units to Northern Ireland at the height of the Troubles. It transferred to 11th Armoured Brigade and moved to Wessex Barracks in Bad Fallingbostel in October 1974 from where it again deployed units to Northern Ireland. It returned home re-locating to Bovington Camp as RAC Centre Regiment in December 1977 and then went back to West Germany to join 4th Armoured Brigade becoming based at Swinton Barracks in Münster in November 1980. A squadron was sent to Northern Ireland to undertake guard duties at the Maze Prison in December 1982.

After deploying two squadrons to the Persian Gulf in September 1990 for the Gulf War, the regiment returned to the United Kingdom later in the year. In 1993, with the reductions in forces after the end of the Cold War, the regiment was amalgamated with the 16th/5th The Queen's Royal Lancers to form the Queen's Royal Lancers.

== Battle honours ==
The regiment's battle honours were as follows:
The Second World War: Tebourba Gap, Bou Arada, Kasserine, Thala, Fondouk, El Kourzia, Tunis, Hammam Lif, North Africa 1942-43, Cassino II, Monte Piccolo, Capture of Perugia, Advance to Florence, Argenta Gap, Fossa Cembalina, Italy 1944-45

== Commanding officers ==
Commanding officers of the regiment have included:

- 1958–1961: Lt Col Richard G. Satterthwaite
- 1961–1963: Lt Col Robert D.A. Renton
- 1963–1966: Lt Col Robert H.A. Cockburn
- 1966–1968: Lt Col Richard L.C. Tamplin
- 1968–1970: Lt Col Charles P.M. Mulloy
- 1970–1973: Lt Col John W. Turner
- 1973–1975: Lt Col Arthur R. Douglas-Nugent
- 1975–1977: Lt Col Nigel M. Still
- 1977–1979: Lt Col R. Shaun Longsdon
- 1979–1981: Lt Col Richard H. Swinburn
- 1981–1984: Lt Col Brian G. Hamilton-Russell
- 1984–1985: Lt Col Reginald I.S. Purbrick
- 1985–1988: Lt Col William J. Hurrell
- 1988–1990: Lt Col Andrew A.J.R. Cumming
- 1990–1992: Lt Col Robert D.S. Gordon
- 1992–1993: Lt Col Robert A. McKenzie-Johnston

== Colonel-in-Chief ==
- 1969–1993: Princess Alexandra, LG, GCVO

== Regimental Colonels ==
Regimental colonels were:

- 1922–1926 (17th Lancers): F.M. Sir Douglas Haig, 1st Earl Haig, KT, OM, GCB, GCMG, GCVO, KCIE
- 1922–1938 (21st Lancers): Gen. Sir Herbert Alexander Lawrence, GCB
- 1938–1947: Lt-Gen. Sir Bertie Drew Fisher, KCB, CMG, DSO
- 1947–1957: F.M. Sir Richard Amyatt Hull, GCB, DSO
- 1957–1965: Brig. Richard Gustavus Hamilton-Russell, DSO
- 1965–1975: Maj-Gen. Ronald Edward Coaker, CB, CBE, MC
- 1975–1983: Col. Michael Colvin Watson, OBE, MC, DL
- 1983–1988: Brig. John Warner Turner
- 1988–1993: Col. Robert Shaun Longsdon
- 1993 Regiment amalgamated with 16th/5th The Queen's Royal Lancers to form The Queen's Royal Lancers

== Alliances ==
The regiment's alliances included:

- British Ceylon - Ceylon Mounted Rifles
- Canada - Lord Strathcona's Horse (Royal Canadians)

Preceded by 17th Lancers; 21st Lancers	17th/21st Lancers; 1922–1993	Succeeded by Queen's Royal Lancers
