= John Gibsone =

General John Charles Hope Gibsone (b. Old Pentland 21 May 1810 – d. Leamington Spa 18 July 1884) was in the British Army for 50 years and Regimental Colonel of two regiments: the 8th King's Royal Irish Hussars from 1868 to 1875; and the 17th Lancers from 1875 to 1884.

== Family ==
He was the only son of Major General David Anderson-Gibson of Pentlandand and his wife Helen, only daughter of Sir John Gibsone, also of Pentland. In 1835 he married Jane Louisa Bringloe: they had six children, two sons and four daughters.

== Education ==
Gibsone was educated at Harrow School.

== Career ==
In 1830, Gibsone became a cornet. He was promoted to lieutenant in 1833, captain in 1835 and major in 1845. He was present "during almost every occasion" during The Seventh Xhosa War. He was promoted lieutenant colonel in 1847, colonel in 1854 and general in 1862. From 1854 to 1862 he was in command at various cavalry depots.

Military offices
Preceded by John Lawrenson	Colonel of the 8th King's Royal Irish Hussars; 1868 - 1875	Succeeded by Rudolph de Salis
Preceded by Charles William Morley Balders	Colonel of the 17th Light Dragoons; 1875–1884	Succeeded by Henry Roxby Benson
