= John Berryman (VC) =

Recipient of the Victoria Cross

John Berryman VC
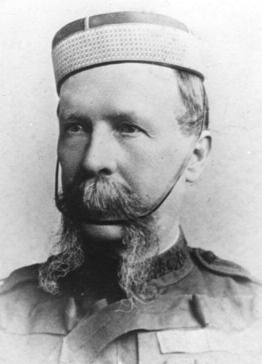
- John Berryman
- Born: 18 July 1825; Dudley, England
- Died: 27 June 1896 (aged 70); Woldingham, England
- Burial place: St Agatha's Churchyard, Woldingham
- Military career
- Allegiance: United Kingdom
- Branch: British Army
- Rank: Major
- Units: 17th Lancers; 5th Lancers
- Conflicts: Crimean War; Indian Mutiny; Anglo-Zulu War
- Awards: Victoria Cross

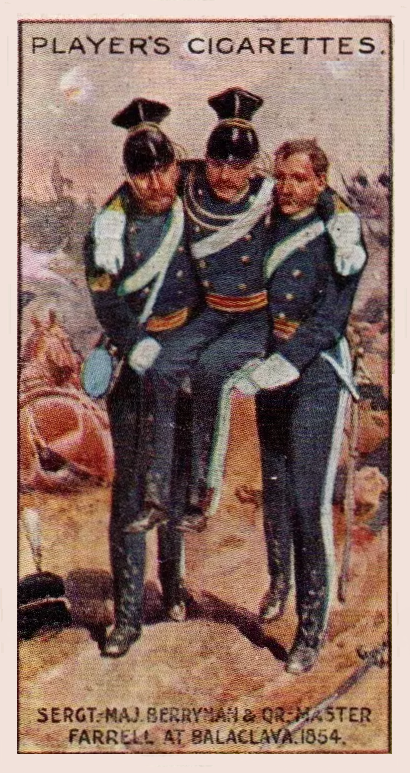
Cigarette card depicting Berryman and Farrell winning the VC

John Berryman VC (18 July 1825 – 27 June 1896) was a British Army non-commissioned officer and a recipient of the Victoria Cross, the highest award for gallantry in the face of the enemy that can be awarded to British and Commonwealth forces.

Born in Dudley, England, the son of a pub landlord, he enlisted in the 17th Lancers in May 1848 and served with the regiment throughout the Crimean War.

== Victoria Cross action ==
Berryman was a 29 years old Troop Sergeant-Major in the 17th Lancers (Duke of Cambridge's Own) during the Crimean War when the following deed took place for which he was awarded the VC.

On 25 October 1854 at Balaclava, Crimea, (see Charge of the Light Brigade) Troop Sergeant-Major Berryman, whose horse had been shot under him, stopped on the field with a wounded officer amidst a storm of shot and shell. Two sergeants (John Farrell and Joseph Malone) came to his assistance and between them they carried the wounded officer out of range of the guns. On a previous occasion Berryman had captured three Russian prisoners.

Berryman was invested with his VC by Queen Victoria in Hyde Park, London on 26 June 1857.

== Further career ==
After serving in the Indian Mutiny in 1858, Berryman was made Regimental sergeant major of the 17th lancers in 1860, and commissioned as a lieutenant and quartermaster in 1864. He was with the regiment during the Zulu War in 1879. In May 1880 he transferred to the 5th lancers as quartermaster, receiving promotion to honorary captain in July 1881. He retired with the rank of honorary major in July 1883.

He died at Woldingham, Surrey in 1896 and is buried there in St Agatha's Churchyard.

His VC is not publicly owned.
