= Keydell House =

Coordinates: 50°51′10″N 1°0′46″W

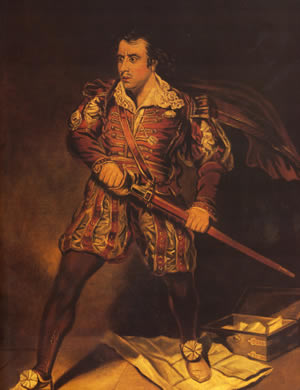
Edmund Kean, former owner

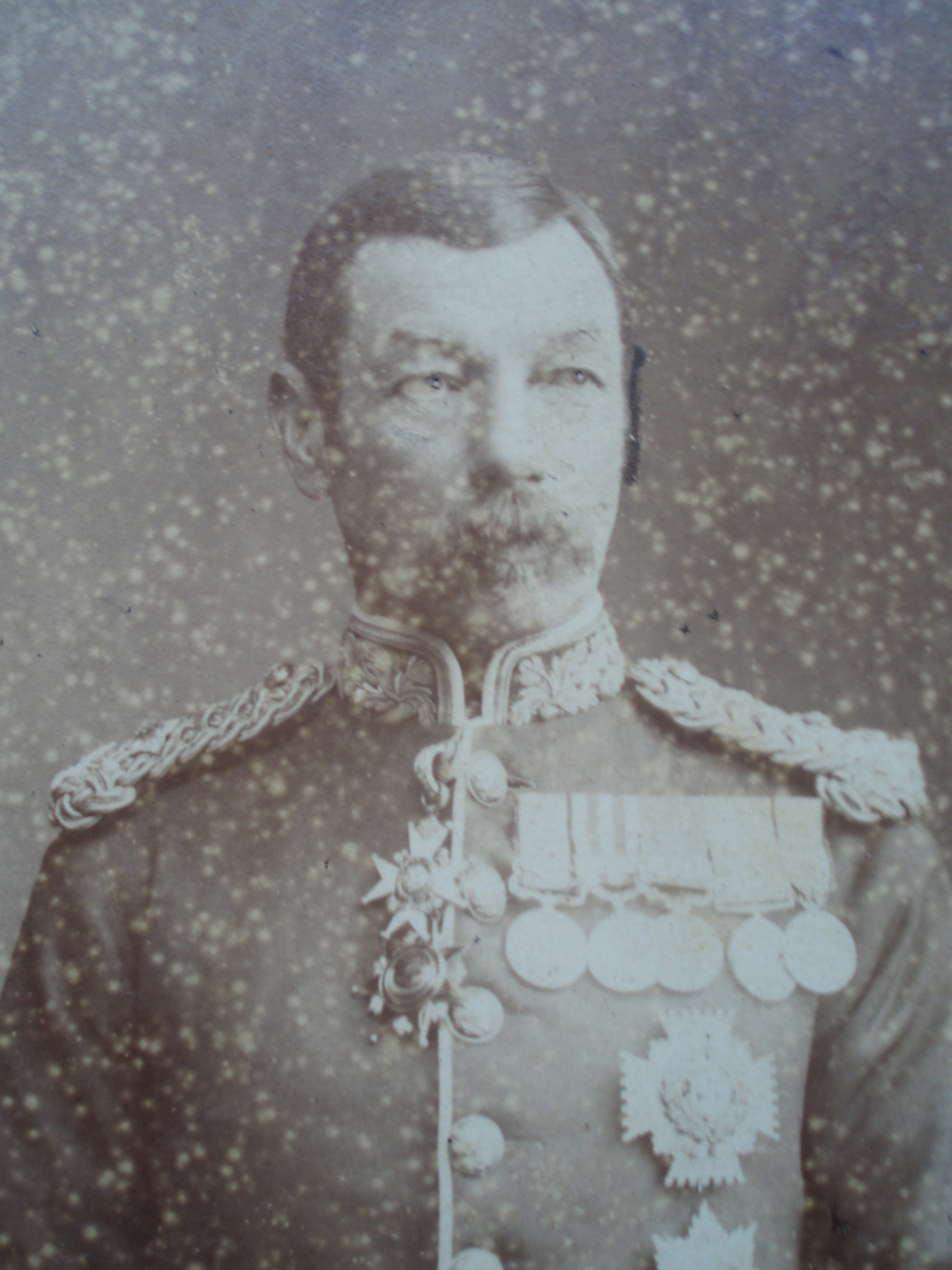
Drury-Lowe, former owner

Keydell House was situated in 45 acres (180,000 m^{2}) of land near Lovedean Corner, in the village of Horndean, part of the ecclesiastical parish of Catherington Hampshire from Georgian times until its demolition to make way for houses in 1968.

== History ==
The earliest deed still in existence (for the field "Nine Acres") is dated 1660. The House itself was a three-storey, rectangular mansion with shuttered windows and formal gardens. These eventually became Keydell Nurseries, although the business which still trades under that name moved to a bigger site in 1987. The House had two notable owners: the Victorian actor Edmund Kean; and, most famously, Sir Drury Curzon Drury-Lowe, a full general of the British Army.

== Notes ==
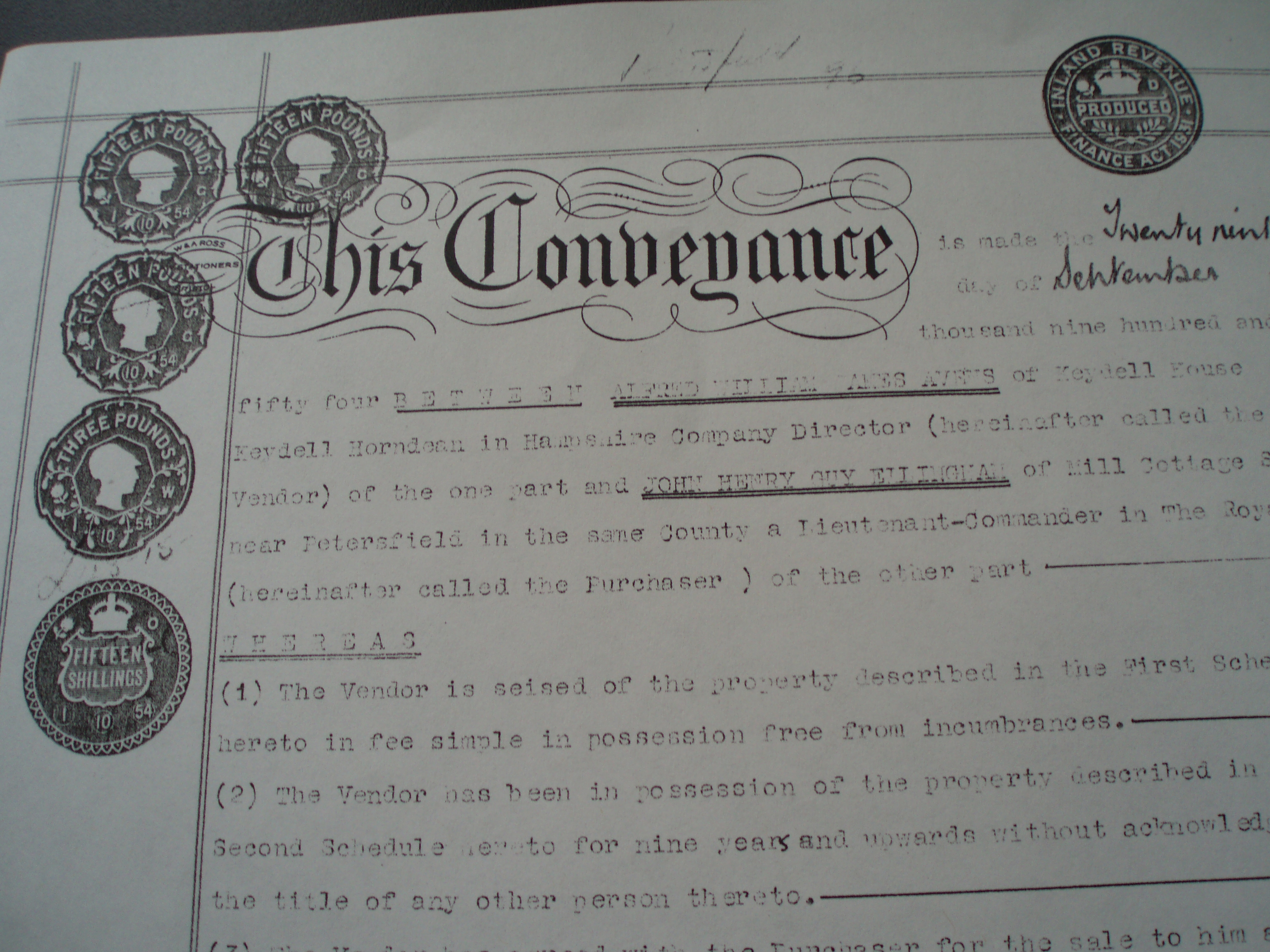
1955

1931 map of site
