= Richardson's Theatre =

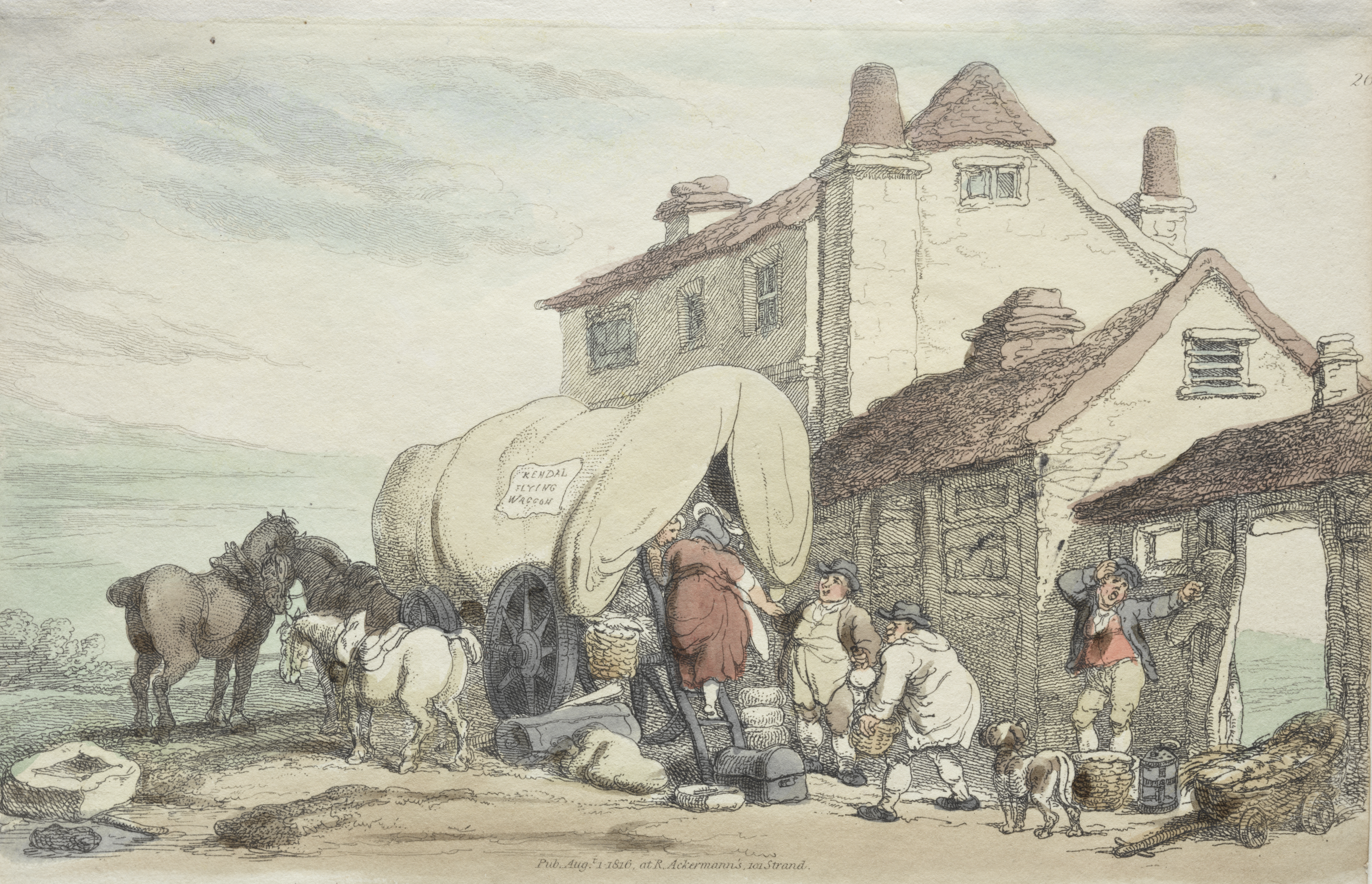
Richardson's Show by Thomas Rowlandson, 1816

Richardson's Theatre or Richardson's Show was a travelling fairground theatre founded in 1798 by John Richardson (1766–1836), which performed in London and the surrounding area in the early nineteenth century.

== History ==
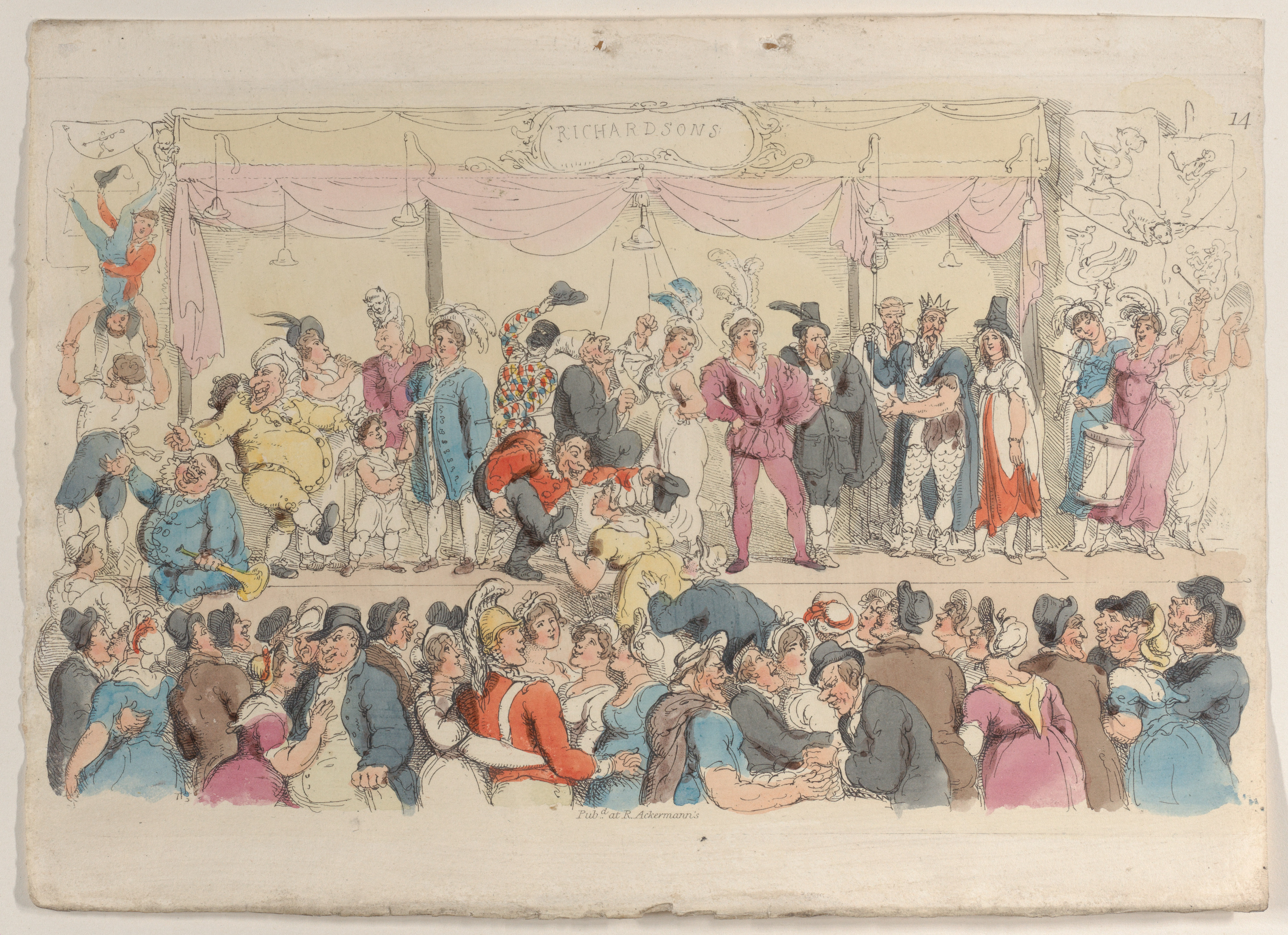
Richardson's Show by Thomas Rowlandson, 1816

Richardson began his career as an actor. He joined Mrs. Penley's travelling theatre company in 1782, but on seeing the small profits to be made with her, he left acting and moved to London, becoming a broker. He eventually saved enough money to open his own troupe.

Richardson first opened his theatrical production at Bartholomew Fair in 1798 using scenery from Drury Lane. The performances took place in a narrow booth (100 feet by 30 feet), colourful and brightly lit. The show toured, in the London area, to such fairs as Southwark, Brook Green and Greenwich. Over time, Richardson's booth expanded, and he ran several performances simultaneously, and he could stage over a dozen burlesques and melodramas each day. By 1828, the price of admission was sixpence, and refreshments were another profit source for the troupe. The young Edmund Kean learned his craft here, before moving on to a more respectable theatrical environment. After Richardson's death, the show was continued until 1853 by Nelson Lee.

== Contemporary account by Dickens ==
The show, as it existed at its grandest, near the end of Richardson's life, is described by Charles Dickens in Sketches by Boz:

This immense booth, with the large stage in front, so brightly illuminated with variegated lamps, and pots of burning fat, is ‘Richardson’s,’ where you have a melodrama (with three murders and a ghost), a pantomime, a comic song, an overture, and some incidental music, all done in five-and-twenty minutes.... The company are now promenading outside.....

‘Just a-going to begin! Pray come for’erd, come for’erd,’ exclaims the man in the countryman’s dress, for the seventieth time: and people force their way up the steps in crowds. The band suddenly strikes up, the harlequin and columbine set the example, reels are formed in less than no time, the Roman heroes place their arms a-kimbo, and dance with considerable agility; and the leading tragic actress, and the gentleman who enacts the ‘swell’ in the pantomime, foot it to perfection. ‘All in to begin,’ shouts the manager, when no more people can be induced to ‘come for’erd,’ and away rush the leading members of the company to do the dreadful in the first piece.

A change of performance takes place every day during the fair, but the story of the tragedy is always pretty much the same. There is a rightful heir, who loves a young lady, and is beloved by her; and a wrongful heir, who loves her too, and isn’t beloved by her; and the wrongful heir gets hold of the rightful heir, and throws him into a dungeon, just to kill him off when convenient, for which purpose he hires a couple of assassins—a good one and a bad one—who, the moment they are left alone, get up a little murder on their own account, the good one killing the bad one, and the bad one wounding the good one. Then the rightful heir is discovered in prison... and the young lady comes in to two bars of soft music, and embraces the rightful heir; and then the wrongful heir comes in to two bars of quick music (technically called ‘a hurry’), and goes on in the most shocking manner, throwing the young lady about as if she was nobody, and calling the rightful heir ‘Ar-recreant—ar-wretch!’ in a very loud voice, which answers the double purpose of displaying his passion, and preventing the sound being deadened by the sawdust. The interest becomes intense; the wrongful heir draws his sword, and rushes on the rightful heir; a blue smoke is seen, a gong is heard, and a tall white figure... slowly rises to the tune of ‘Oft in the stilly night.’ This is no other than the ghost of the rightful heir’s father, who was killed by the wrongful heir’s father, at sight of which the wrongful heir becomes apoplectic.... Then the rightful heir throws down his chain; and then two men, a sailor, and a young woman (the tenantry of the rightful heir) come in, and the ghost makes dumb motions to them, which they, by supernatural interference, understand—for no one else can; and the ghost (who can’t do anything without blue fire) blesses the rightful heir and the young lady, by half suffocating them with smoke: and then a muffin-bell rings, and the curtain drops.

== Contemporary depictions ==
The booth appears on a brightly coloured sketch by Thomas Rowlandson. Another view shows the crowd outside Richardson's booth. This 1805 view shows Richardson's Theatre in the earlier days.
