= John Farrell (VC) =

Irish recipient of the Victoria Cross (1826–1865)

John Farrell VC
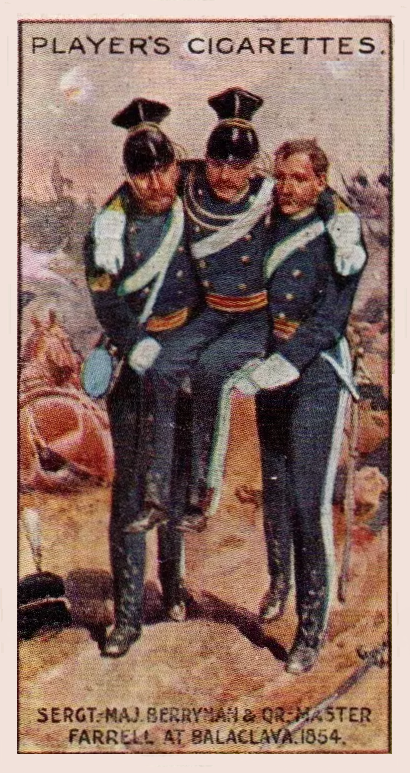
- Cigarette card depicting Farrell and Berryman winning the VC
- Born: March 1826; Dublin, Ireland
- Died: 31 August 1865 (aged 39); Secunderabad, India
- Burial place: Secunderabad Cemetery
- Military career
- Allegiance: United Kingdom
- Branch: British Army
- Rank: Quartermaster-Sergeant
- Units: 85th Foot; 17th Lancers
- Conflicts: Crimean War; Indian Mutiny
- Awards: Victoria Cross

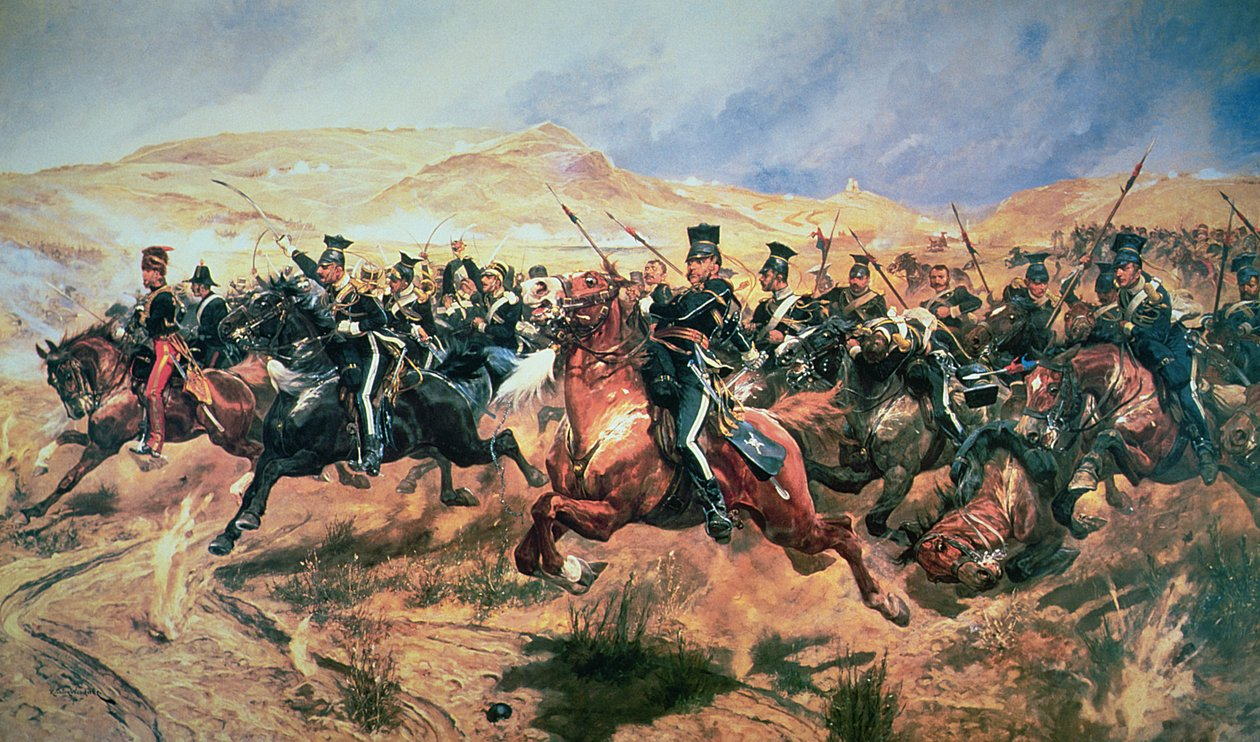
Charge of the Light Brigade, Balaclava, 25 October 1854 (Richard Caton Woodville Jr., 1894)

John Farrell VC (March 1826, Dublin – 31 August 1865) was an Irish soldier who was a recipient of the Victoria Cross, the highest and most prestigious award for gallantry in the face of the enemy that can be awarded to British and Commonwealth forces.

He was born in March 1826 in Dublin, Ireland. In 1843 he joined the Army, serving first with the 85th Foot and then the 17th Lancers, with whom he travelled to the Crimea in 1854.

Farrell was a sergeant in the 17th Lancers (Duke of Cambridge's Own), British Army during the Crimean War when the following deed took place for which he was awarded the VC:

On 25 October 1854 at Balaklava, Crimea during the Charge of the Light Brigade, Sergeant Farrell, whose horse had been killed under him, stopped on the field and amidst a storm of shot and shell helped Troop Sergeant Major John Berryman and Sergeant Joseph Malone to move a severely wounded officer (who subsequently died) out of range of the guns.

After serving in the Indian Mutiny in 1858 and achieving the rank of Quartermaster-Sergeant, Farrell transferred to the 2nd Light Cavalry, Indian Army. He was serving with that unit at Secunderabad India when on 31 August 1865 he died from a liver abscess. He is buried in Secunderabad Cemetery.

His VC is not publicly owned.

== Bibliography ==
- The Register of the Victoria Cross (1981, 1988 and 1997)
- Clarke, Brian D. H. (1986). "A register of awards to Irish-born officers and men". The Irish Sword. XVI (64): 185–287.
- Ireland's VCs (Dept of Economic Development, 1995)
- Monuments to Courage (David Harvey, 1999)
- Irish Winners of the Victoria Cross (Richard Doherty & David Truesdale, 2000)
