= John Richardson (showman) =

English showman

- Born: 1767?
- Died: 14 November 1837
- Occupation: Showman

John Richardson (1767? – 14 November 1837) was an English showman. He was the founder of the travelling theatre, Richardson's Theatre.

== Biography ==
Richardson began life in the workhouse at Great Marlow, Buckinghamshire, in which town he subsequently filled several menial situations. Starting to try his fortune in London, he obtained employment at a shilling a day with an Islington cowkeeper named Rhodes. Here he formed theatrical tastes and aspirations, joining in 1782 in a club-room in the Paviour's Arms, Shadwell, the travelling company of a Mrs. Penley. With little success the company travelled from town to town, until Richardson, returning to London, started in a small way as a broker. Having thus accumulated some money, he took in 1796 the Harlequin public-house, opposite the stage-door of Drury Lane, frequented by theatrical folk. In the same year he made at Bartholomew fair his first experiment as a showman, exhibiting a rude dramatic performance on a platform built out of a first-floor window, which was approached by a flight of stairs from the street; stalls for the sale of gingerbread stood beneath the structure. Twenty-one performances a day are said to have been given. Encouraged by his success, he went on tour. At Edmonton he appeared with Tom Jefferies, a clown of high repute from Astley's. Among those he engaged were Mrs. Carey and her sons Edmund (Kean) and Henry. Mrs. Carey appeared as Queen Dollalolla in ‘Tom Thumb,’ and Kean apparently as Tom Thumb. He also engaged Oxberry from a private theatre in Queen Anne Street, Saville Faucit, Barnes, the favourite pantaloon, Wallack, and many others who subsequently rose to distinction.

Although uneducated, Richardson was shrewd and clever, and knew how to hit public tastes. Bartholomew fair and Greenwich were his favourite haunts. Mark Lemon describes a somewhat cheerless performance he once saw, with the rain coming through the canvas, of the ‘Wandering Outlaw, or the Hour of Retribution,’ concluding with the ‘Death of Orsina, and the Appearance of the Accusing Spirit.’ Richardson employed as scene-painters Grieve and Greenwood. His dresses compared in excellence of material with those at the patent theatres. He tried once to sell them, but bought them in at 2,000l., as he held them worth 3,000l. The front of his show when it was in its meridian glory cost 600l. In Richardson's later days his performance consisted of a tragedy, a comic song usually by a person in rustic dress, and a pantomime. The tragedies, which were changed every day, consisted of ‘Virginius,’ ‘The Wandering Outlaw,’ and ‘Wallace, the Hero of Scotland.’ When the fair lasted four days ‘The Warlock of the Glen,’ taken in some sort from Scott's ‘Black Dwarf,’ was given. The ghost was the great effect in ‘Virginius.’ ‘Dr. Faustus, or the Devil will have his own,’ was the title of one of the pantomimes. The nominal prices of admission were two shillings boxes, one shilling pit, and sixpence gallery.

A careful and abstemious man, Richardson put by money which enabled him, after expending a good deal in charity, to leave over 20,000l. At St. Albans, on one occasion, a fire occurred, in the extinction of which Richardson and his company took a gallant part. A subscription was raised for the sufferers, and Richardson, dressed as usual in a seedy black coat, red waistcoat, corduroy breeches, and worsted stockings, handed in a subscription of 100l. ‘What name?’ asked the clerk, receiving the reply, ‘Richardson, the penny showman.’ For his services and liberality he received a permission to play constantly in St. Albans during, and for three days after, the fair. Richardson bought and furnished ‘handsomely’ a cottage in Horsemonger Lane, Southwark, but preferred to live in his caravan. Three days before his death he was, reluctantly, removed, by order of his medical attendant, into the house, where, at the reputed age of seventy, he died on 14 November 1837. He desired in his will to be buried in Marlow churchyard, in the same grave as a spotted boy who, twenty years previously, had proved an attraction. To the two Reeds, musicians, he left 1,000l. each, and the same sum to the landlord of the Mazeppa public-house, Horsleydown. Some other legacies were left to members of his company, and the remainder of his fortune went to two nephews and a niece.
