= 17th Lancers =

British Army cavalry regiment

17th Lancers (Duke of Cambridge's Own)
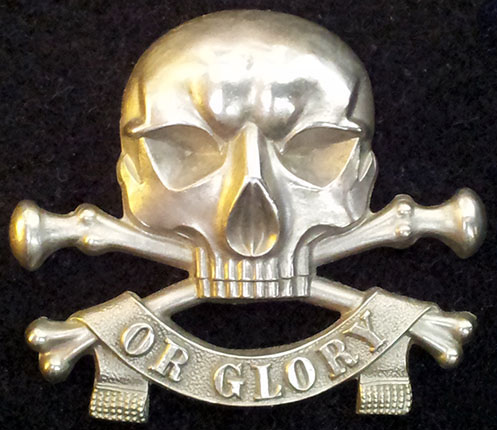
- Cap badge of the regiment
- Active: 7 November 1759 – 27 June 1922
- Country: Kingdom of Great Britain (1759–1800); United Kingdom (1801–1922)
- Branch: Army
- Type: Line cavalry
- Role: Lancer regiment
- Nicknames: The Death or Glory Boys, The Horse Marines, The Tots, The White Lancers
- Motto: Death Or Glory
- March: Quick: The White Lancers; Slow: Occasional Overture
- Anniversaries: Battle of Balaclava (25 October); Battle of Ulundi (4 July)

Commanders
- Notable commanders: General Thomas Gage Major General Thomas Pelham-Clinton, 3rd Duke of Newcastle; General Oliver De Lancey; General Lord Edward Somerset; Lieutenant-General Sir John Elley; Field Marshal Prince George, 2nd Duke of Cambridge; General Henry Roxby Benson; Lieutenant-General Sir Drury Curzon Drury-Lowe; Major General Thomas Arthur Cooke Field Marshal Douglas Haig, 1st Earl Haig

The 17th Lancers (Duke of Cambridge's Own) was a cavalry regiment of the British Army, raised in 1759 and notable for its participation in the Charge of the Light Brigade during the Crimean War. The regiment was amalgamated with the 21st Lancers to form the 17th/21st Lancers in 1922.

== History ==
=== Seven Years War ===
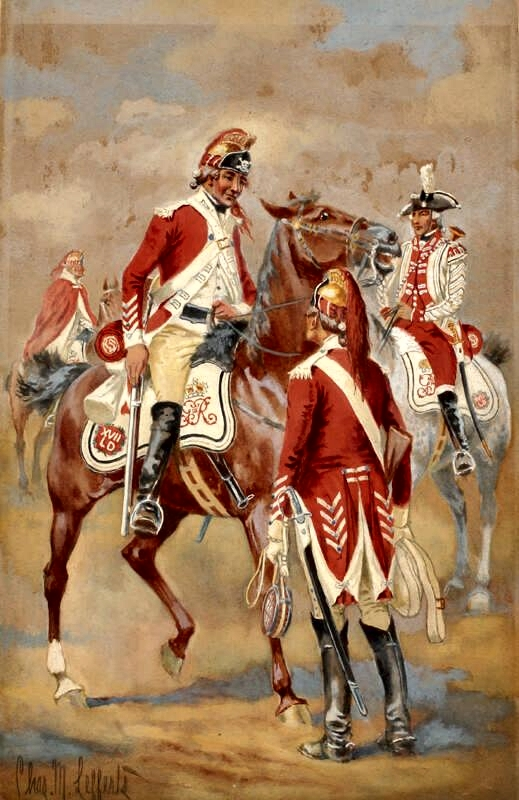
Illustration of the regiment during the American War of Independence

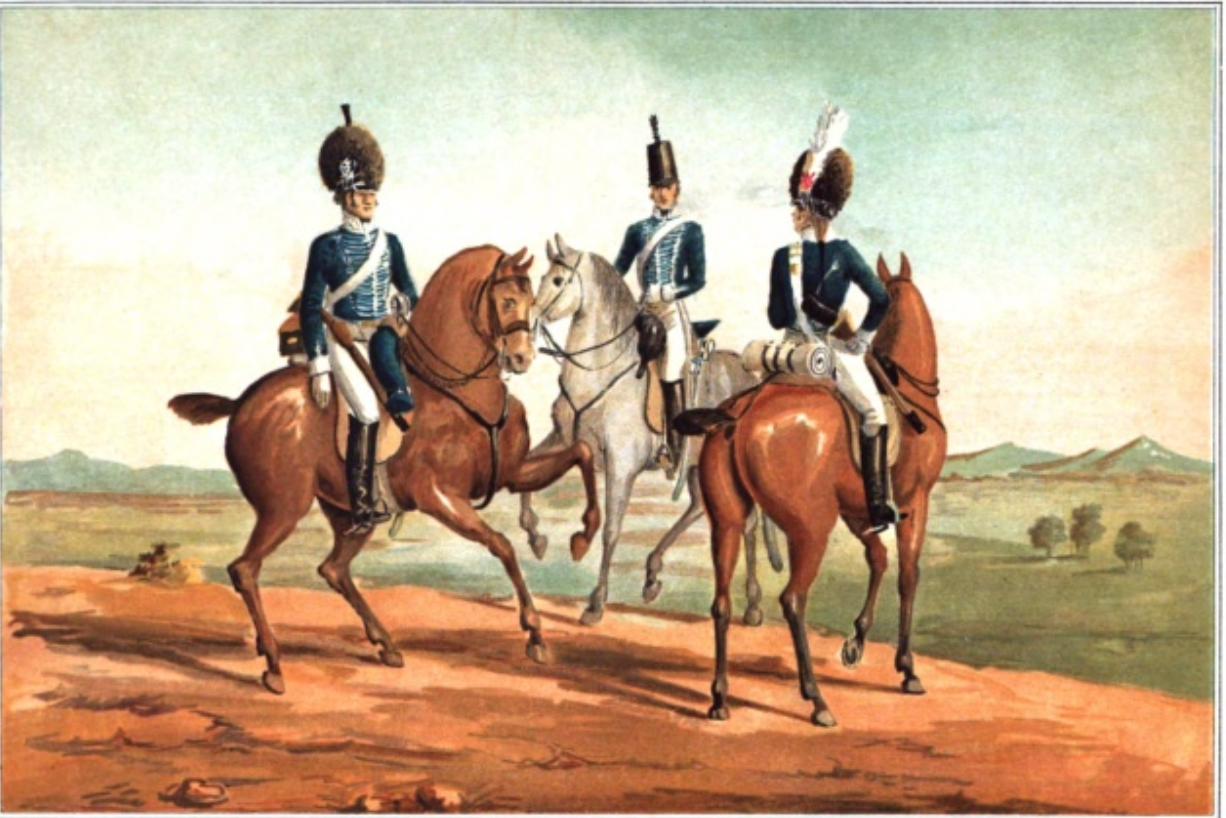
Illustration of the regiment during the Peninsular War

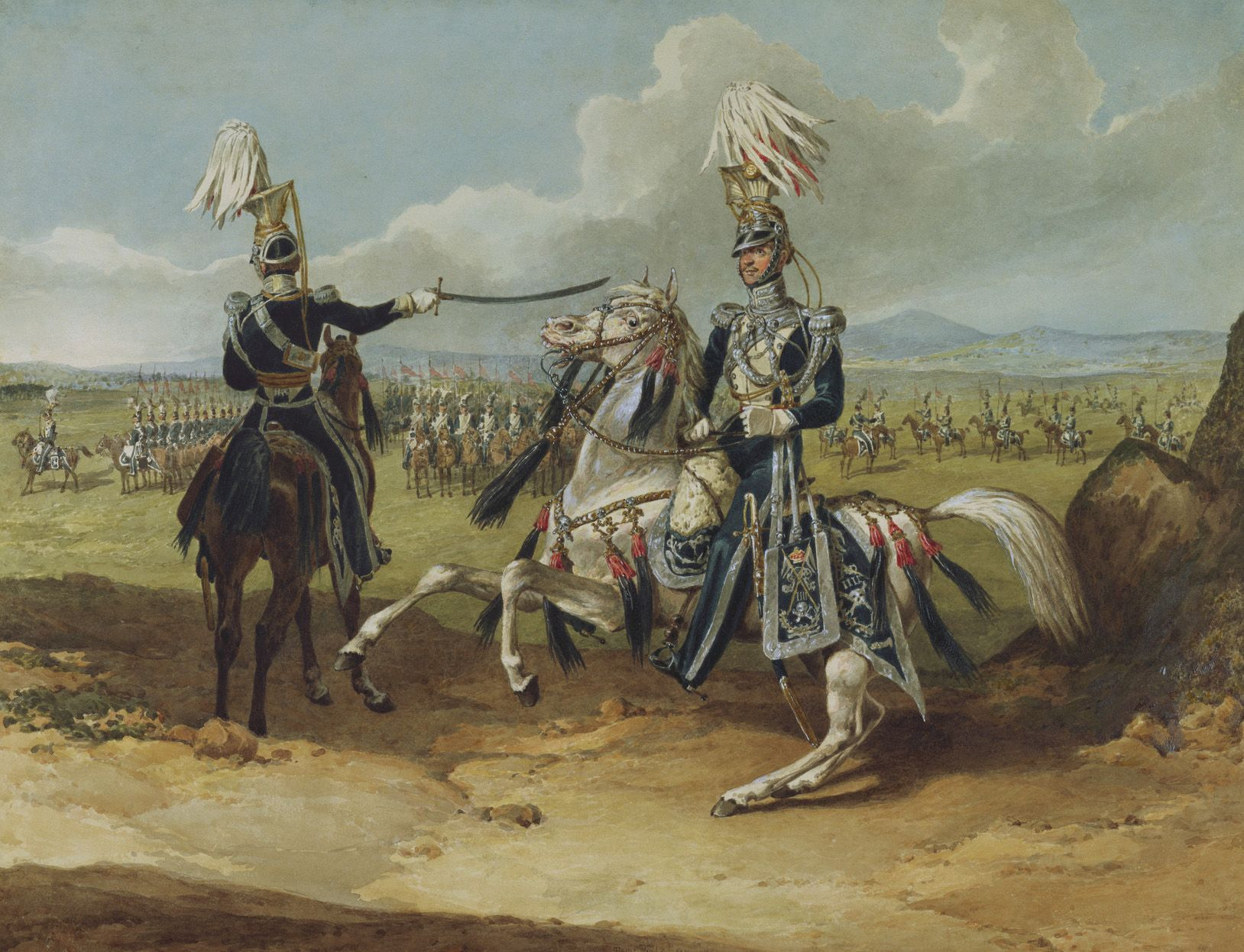
1825 painting of the regiment

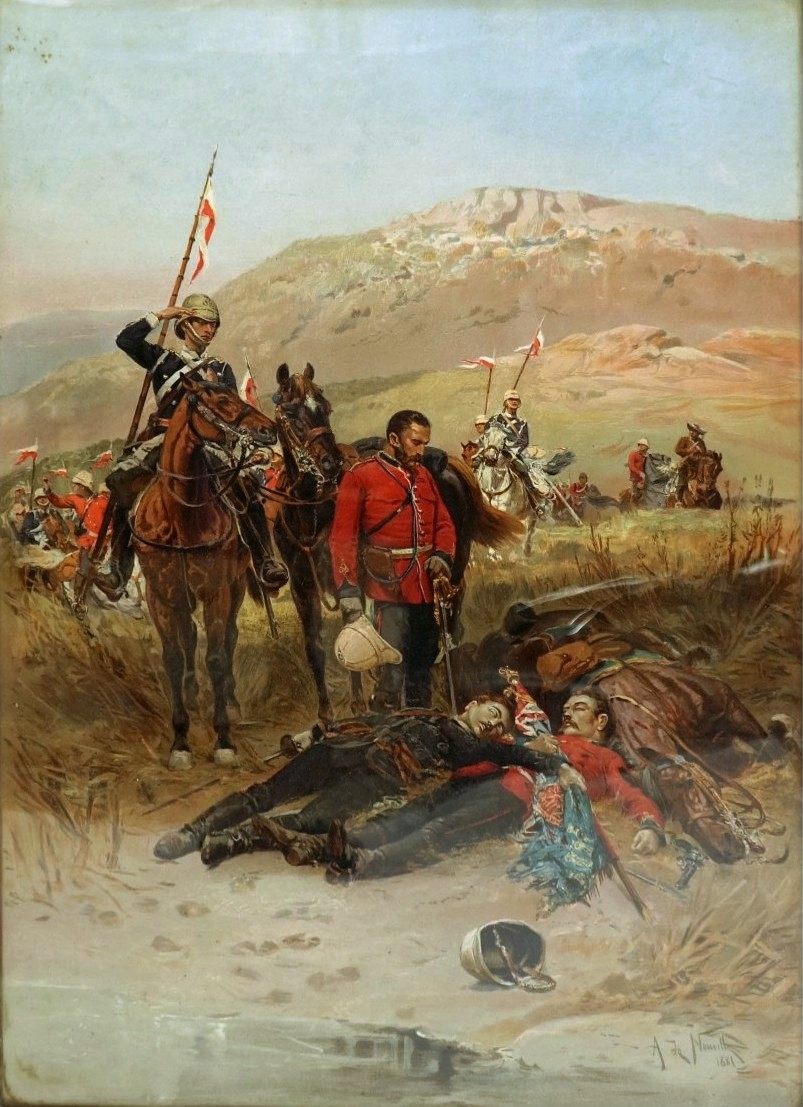
1881 painting depicting a regiment patrol discovering two 24th Foot officers who died saving the colours at Isandlwana. However, the regiment had not arrived in South Africa when the officers were found.

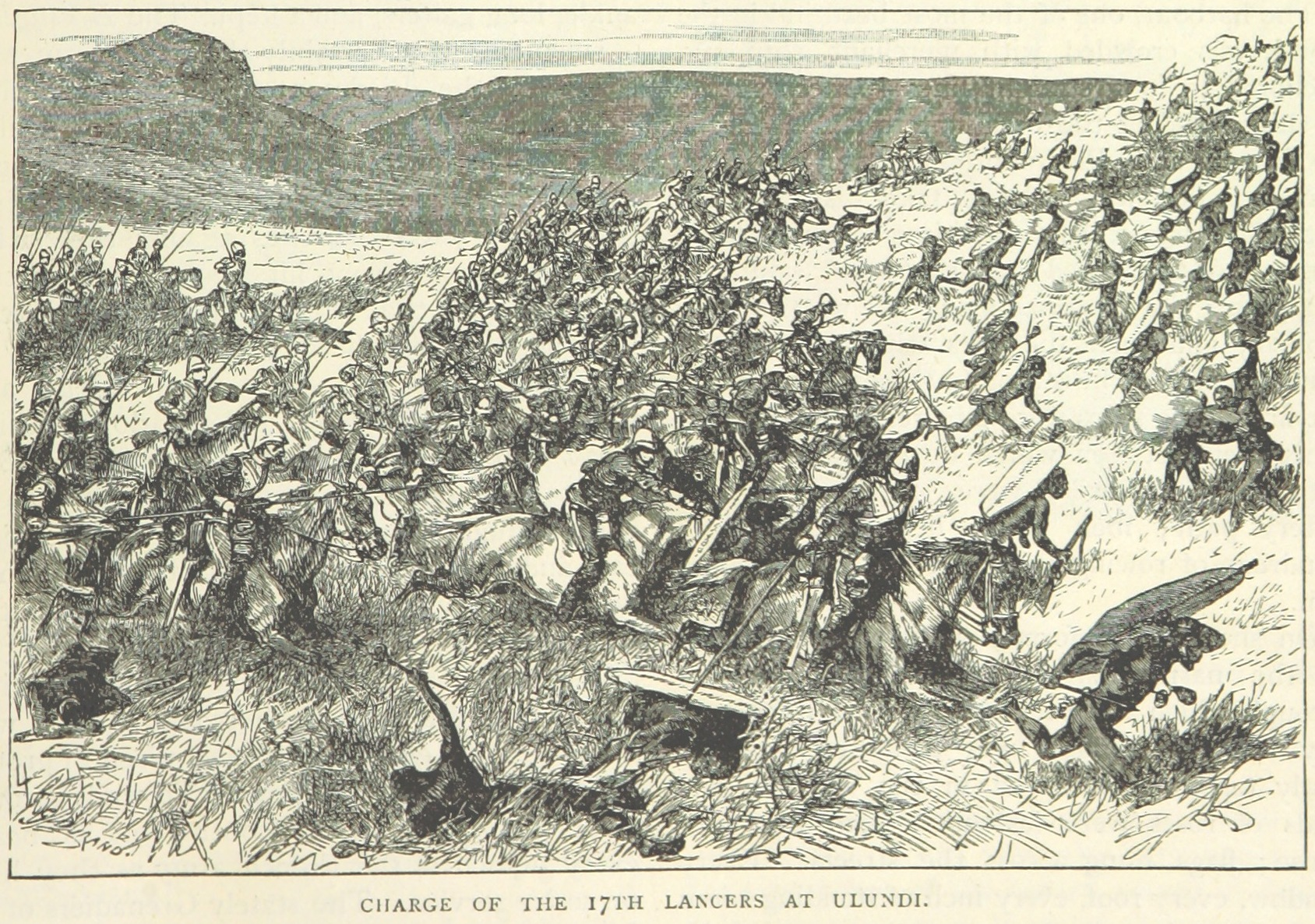
The regiment at the Battle of Ulundi

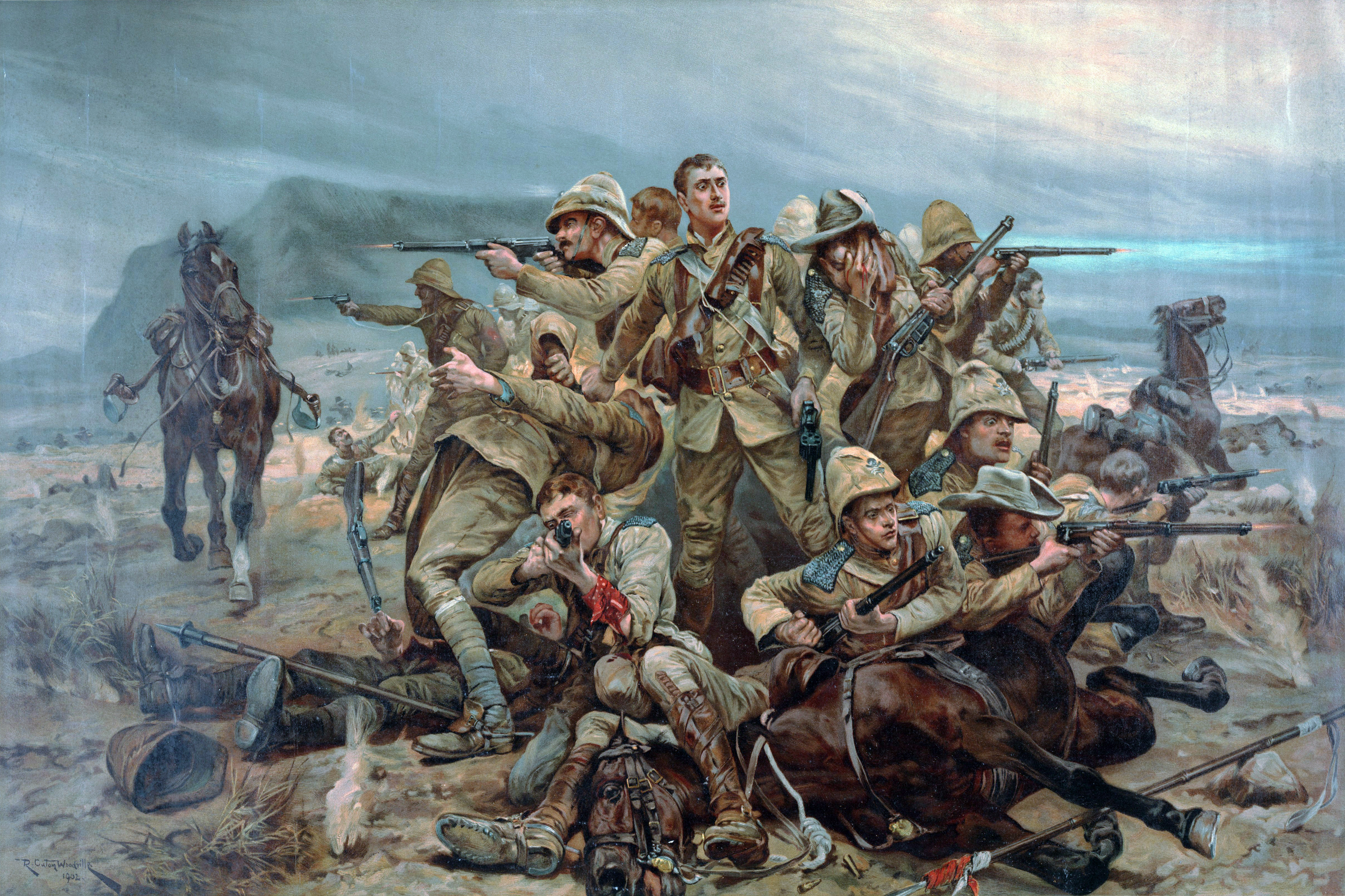
Painting depicting the regiment at Modderfontein

In 1759, Colonel John Hale of the 47th Foot was ordered back to Britain with General James Wolfe's final dispatches and news of his victory in the Battle of Quebec in September 1759. After his return, he was rewarded with land in Canada and granted permission to raise a regiment of light dragoons. He formed the regiment in Hertfordshire on 7 November 1759 as the 18th Regiment of (Light) Dragoons, which also went by the name of Hale's Light Horse. Colonel Hale chose for the regiment: the Death's Head with the motto "Or Glory".

The regiment saw service in Germany in 1761 and was renumbered the 17th Regiment of (Light) Dragoons in April 1763 In 1764 the regiment went to Ireland. In May 1766 it was renumbered again, this time as the 3rd Regiment of Light Dragoons. It regained the 17th numeral in 1769 as the 17th Regiment of (Light) Dragoons.

=== American War of Independence ===
Led by Lt Col Samuel Birch, the regiment was sent to North America in 1775, arriving in Boston, then besieged by American rebels in the American Revolutionary War. It fought in the Battle of Bunker Hill, a costly British victory, in June 1775. The regiment was withdrawn to Halifax. It fought at the Battle of Long Island in August 1776 at the Battle of White Plains in October 1776 and at the Battle of Fort Washington in November 1776. It was in action again at the Battle of Forts Clinton and Montgomery in October 1777, the Battle of Crooked Billet in May 1778 and the Battle of Barren Hill later that month.

A troop from the 17th was attached to the British Legion, under the command of Colonel Banastre Tarleton, and was engaged in a number of battles of the southern campaign. With regimental pride, the regular dragoons of the 17th preserved an identity separate from the provincial unit. They kept their fading scarlet coats rather than adopting the green of the Legion.

A lieutenant was killed and several private soldiers were killed or wounded at the Battle of Cowpens in January 1781. The Legion cavalry included many volunteers from prisoners captured at the Battle of Camden. These replacements refused orders to engage the enemy at Cowpens. Tarleton combined Legion officers with the men of the 17th and led about 50 in a charge, attempting to support the right flank. Although initially successful, the dragoons were counter-charged by a larger force of concealed Patriot cavalry.

The American War of Independence officially ended in 1783. An officer of the regiment, Captain Stapleton, had the distinction of delivering to George Washington the despatch confirming the declaration of the cessation of hostilities.

=== French Revolutionary Wars ===
The regiment returned to Ireland, where it remained until 1795, when it sailed for the West Indies to reinforce depleted forces battling the French. Two troops were used to suppress an uprising by "Maroons" in Jamaica soon after arriving in the Caribbean. Other detachments were embarked aboard HMS Success as "supernumeraries". Their experience at sea has been suggested by regimental historians to have gained the regiment the nickname "Horse Marines". Part of the regiment were stationed in Grenada during the Fédon Rebellion and saw active combat. The regiment returned to England in August 1797. It was based in Ireland again from May 1803 to winter 1805.

=== Napoleonic Wars ===
In 1806, the regiment took part in the British invasions of the River Plate in Spanish-controlled South America, then an ally of France during the Napoleonic Wars. Sir Home Riggs Popham had orchestrated an expedition against South America without the British government's sanction. This invasion failed, but a second invasion was launched. The regiment was part of this second force, under Sir Samuel Auchmuty. The British force besieged and captured Montevideo. In 1807, the regiment was part of the force, now under John Whitelocke, that tried to capture Buenos Aires, but this failed abysmally. The British force (including the regiment), was forced to surrender, and did not return home until January 1808.

The regiment was sent to India shortly after returning home. It took part in the attack on the Pindarees in 1817 during the Third Anglo-Maratha War. Disease ravaged the regiment during its residency. While in India, the British Army nominally re-classified the regiment as lancers, and added "lancers" as a subtitle to its regimental designation in 1822. The regiment did not learn of its new status until 1823, when, during a stopover at Saint Helena on its journey back to Britain, a copy of the Army List was obtained. Although the weapon's use had endured in parts of continental Europe, the lance had not been in British service for more than a century. Its reintroduction by the Duke of York, Commander-in-Chief of the British Army, owed much to the performance of Napoleon Bonaparte's Polish Uhlans. The lancer regiments adopted their own version of the Uhlan uniform, including the czapka-style headdress.

In 1826, Lord Bingham (later the 3rd Earl of Lucan) became the regiment's commanding officer when he bought its lieutenant-colonelcy for the reputed sum of £25,000. During his tenure, Bingham invested heavily in the regiment, purchasing uniforms and horses, giving rise to the regimental nickname "Bingham's Dandies".

=== Crimean War ===
The regiment landed at Calamita Bay near Eupatoria in September 1854 for service in the Crimean War and saw action, as part of the light brigade under the command of Major General the Earl of Cardigan, at the Battle of Alma in September 1854. The regiment, commanded by Captain William Morris, was in the first line of cavalry on the left flank during the Charge of the Light Brigade at the Battle of Balaclava in October 1854. The brigade drove through the Russian artillery before smashing straight into the Russian cavalry and pushing them back; it was unable to consolidate its position, however, having insufficient forces and had to withdraw to its starting position, coming under further attack as it did so. The regiment lost 7 officers and 67 men in the debacle. The regiment went on to take part in the Siege of Sevastopol in winter 1854. After the inception of the Victoria Cross in 1856, three members of the regiment received the award for acts of gallantry in the charge: These were Troop Sergeant-Major John Berryman, Sergeant-Major Charles Wooden, and Sergeant John Farrell.

=== Victorian era ===
In December 1857 the regiment arrived in India to reinforce the effort to suppress the Indian Rebellion of 1857. By the time the regiment was prepared for service, the rebellion was effectively over, although it did take part in the pursuit of the Indian rebel leader Tatya Tope. During the course of the pursuit, Lieutenant Evelyn Wood earned the Victoria Cross for gallantry. The regiment returned to England in 1865. The regiment became the 17th Regiment of Lancers in August 1861. When, in 1876, it gained Prince George, Duke of Cambridge as its colonel-in-chief, the regiment adopted the title of the 17th (The Duke of Cambridge's Own) Lancers.

The regiment was sent to Natal Colony for service in the Anglo-Zulu War and fought at the Battle of Ulundi under Sir Drury Curzon Drury-Lowe in July 1879. The regiment was deployed inside a large British infantry square during the attack by the Zulu Army, which had surrounded the British. When the attack appeared to be wavering, the regiment was ordered to advance: their charge routed the warriors with heavy loss and proved to be decisive. The regiment returned to India the same year, remaining there until about 1890 when they returned to England.

=== Second Boer War ===
In February 1900 a contingent from the regiment, comprising Lieutenant-Colonel E. F. Herbert and 500 troops, was deployed to South Africa for service in the Second Boer War, and arrived to Cape Town on the SS Victorian early the next month. The contingent missed the large pitched battles, but still saw action during the war. In 1900, Sergeant Brian Lawrence won the regiment's fifth and final Victoria Cross at Essenbosch Farm. The contingent's most significant action was at the Battle of Elands River (Modderfontein) in September 1901. C Squadron was attacked by a unit of Boers under the command of Jan Smuts; the Lancers mistakenly assumed the unit was friendly because of their attire. The Boers immediately opened fire, attacking from both the front and the rear. The Lancers suffered further casualties at a closed gate that slowed them down. Only Captain Sandeman, the squadron commander, and Lieutenant Lord Vivian survived. The regiment suffered 29 killed and 41 wounded before surrendering, while Boer losses were just one killed and six wounded.

They stayed in South Africa throughout the war, which ended June 1902 with the Peace of Vereeniging. Four months later, 540 officers and men left Cape Town on the SS German in late September 1902, and arrived at Southampton in late October, when they were posted to Edinburgh.

=== First World War ===
The regiment, which was based in Sialkot in India at the start of the First World War, landed in France as part of the 2nd (Sialkot) Cavalry Brigade in the 1st Indian Cavalry Division in November 1914 for service on the Western Front. The regiment fought in its conventional cavalry role at the Battle of Cambrai in November 1917. The regiment was transferred to the 7th Cavalry Brigade, part of the 3rd Cavalry Division, in February 1918 and was used as mobile infantry, plugging gaps whenever the need arose, both as cavalry and as infantry during the last-gasp German spring offensive.

After the signing of the Armistice of 11 November 1918, the regiment remained in continental Europe, joining the British Army of the Rhine in Cologne, Germany.

=== Irish War of Independence ===
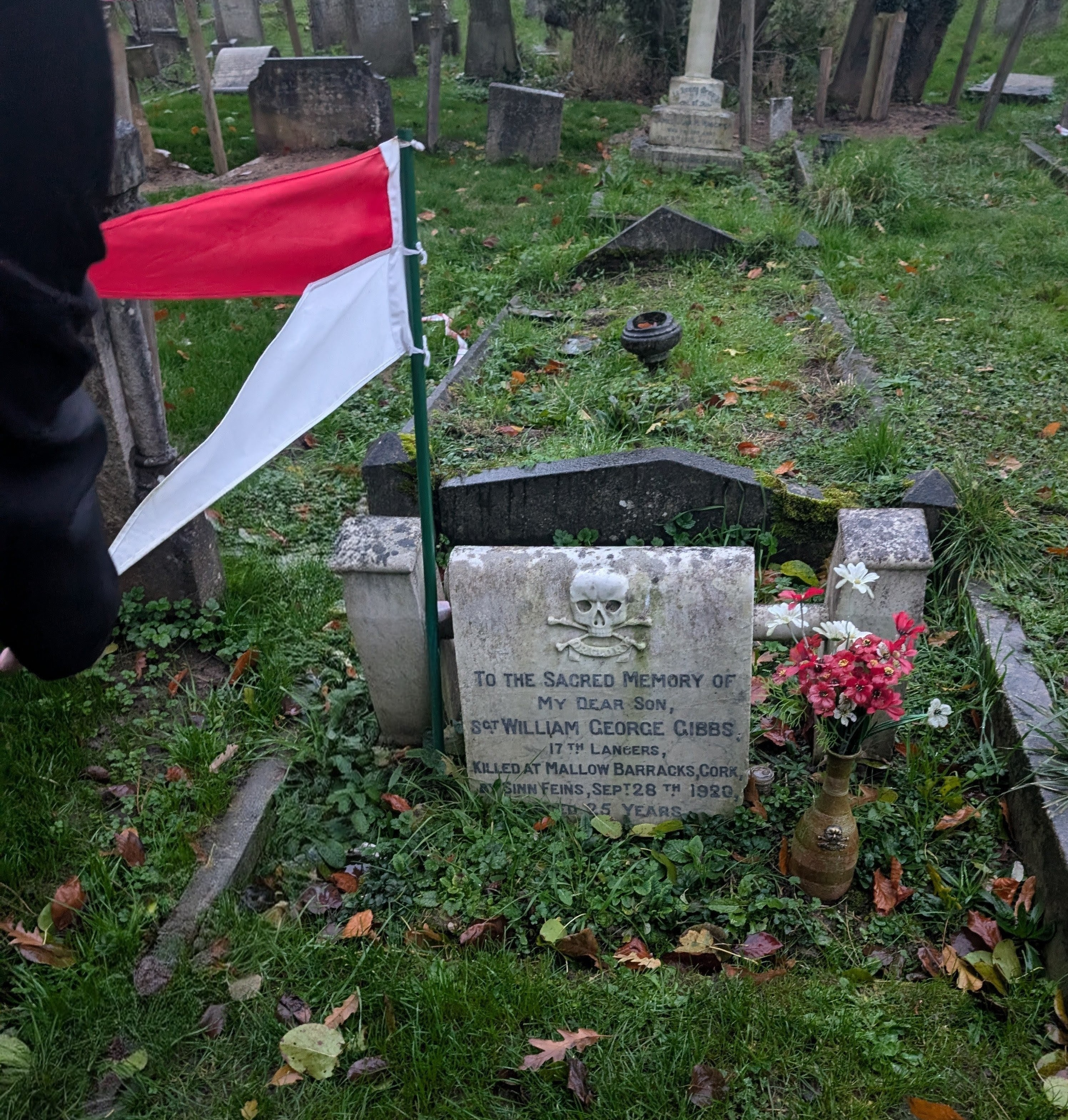
The grave of Sergeant William George Gibbs

The regiment then served in County Cork, Ireland, where it operated against the Irish Republican Army during the War of Independence. On 28 September 1920, IRA volunteers led by Liam Lynch and Ernie O'Malley raided the British Army barracks in Mallow, County Cork. They captured weaponry, freed prisoners and killed a sergeant of the 17th Lancers.

It was the only British Army barracks to be captured during the war. In 1921, the title of the regiment was altered to the 17th Lancers (Duke of Cambridge's Own).

=== Amalgamation ===
The regiment was amalgamated with the 21st Lancers to form the 17th/21st Lancers in 1922.

== Regimental museum ==
The regimental collection is held at The Royal Lancers and Nottinghamshire Yeomanry Museum which is based at Thoresby Hall in Nottinghamshire.

== Battle honours ==
The regiment's battle honours were as follows:

- Early wars: Alma, Balaklava, Inkerman, Sevastopol, Central India, South Africa 1879, South Africa 1900–1902
- First World War: Festubert, Somme 1916 1918, Morval, Cambrai 1917 1918, St. Quentin, Avre, Lys, Hazebrouck, Amiens, Hindenburg Line, St. Quentin Canal, Beaurevoir, Pursuit to Mons, France and Flanders 1914–18

== Regimental Colonels ==
Colonels of the regiment were:

18th Regiment of (Light) Dragoons, or Hale's Light Horse

- 1763–1770: Gen. John Hale

17th Regiment of (Light) Dragoons (1769)

- 1770–1782: Lt-Gen. George Preston
- 1782–1785: Gen. Hon. Thomas Gage
- 1785–1795: Maj-Gen. Thomas Pelham-Clinton, 3rd Duke of Newcastle-under-Lyne
- 1795–1822: Gen. Oliver de Lancey
- 1822–1829: Gen. Lord Robert Edward Henry Somerset

17th Regiment of (Light) Dragoons (Lancers) (1823)

- 1829–1839: Lt-Gen. Sir John Elley
- 1839: Lt-Gen. Sir Joseph Straton
- 1839–1842: Gen. Sir Arthur Benjamin Clifton
- 1842–1852: F.M. HRH George William Frederick Charles, 2nd Duke of Cambridge
- 1852–1854: Maj-Gen. Thomas William Taylor
- 1854–1867: Gen. Sir James Maxwell Wallace

17th Regiment of Lancers (1861)

- 1867–1875: Lt-Gen. Charles William Morley Balders (b. Sunderland 1804; d. Brighton 1875)
- 1875–1884: Gen. John Charles Hope Gibsone

17th (The Duke of Cambridge's Own) Lancers (1876)

- 1884–1892: Gen. Henry Roxby Benson
- 1892–1908: Lt-Gen. Sir Drury Curzon Drury-Lowe
- 1908–1912: Maj-Gen. Thomas Arthur Cooke
- 1912–1922: F.M. Douglas Haig, 1st Earl Haig (to 17th/21st Lancers)

In 1922, the regiment, as the 17th Lancers (Duke of Cambridge's Own), was amalgamated with the 21st Lancers (Empress of India's) to form the 17th/21st Lancers.

== Notable members ==
- Samuel Birch
- Frederick John Cokayne Frith

== See also ==
- British cavalry during the First World War

== Sources ==
- Anglesey, Marquess of (1997). A History of the British Cavalry, 1816–1919, Volume VII, The Curragh Incident and the Western Front 1914. Pen & Sword.
- Babits, Lawrence Edward (2001). A Devil of a Whipping: The Battle of Cowpens. The University of North Carolina Press. ISBN 978-0807849262.
- Babits, Lawrence Edward; Howard, Joshua B. (2009). Long, Obstinate, and Bloody: The Battle of Guilford Courthouse. The University of North Carolina Press. ISBN 978-0807832660.
- Brumwell, Stephen (2007). Paths of Glory: The Life and Death of General James Wolfe. Hambledon Continuum. ISBN 9780826436351.
- Cannon, Richard (1841). Historical Record of the Ninth or the Queen's Royal Regiment of Dragoons, Lancers: Containing an Account of the Formation of the Regiment in 1715 and of Its Subsequent Services to 1841. John W. Parker.
- Cannon, Richard (1841). Historical Record of the Seventeenth Regiment of Light Dragoons, Lancers: Containing an Account of the Formation of the Regiment in 1759 and of Its Subsequent Services to 1841. John W. Parker.
- Featherstone, Donald F. (1978). Weapons and Equipment of the Victorian Soldier. Littlehampton Book Services. ISBN 9780713708479.
- Fortescue, Sir John William (1895). A History of the 17th Lancers (Duke of Cambridge's Own). Macmillan and Co.
- Frederick, John Bassett Moore (1969). Lineage book of the British Army; Mounted Corps and Infantry, 1660–1968. Hope Farm Press.
- Ffrench Blake, Robert Lifford Valentine (1968). The 17th/21st Lancers. Hamish Hamilton.
- Heathcote, Tony (1999). The British Field Marshals 1736–1997. Leo Cooper. ISBN 0-85052-696-5.
- Pakenham, Thomas (1992). The Boer War. Abacus. ISBN 978-0349104669.
- Raugh, Harold E. (2004). The Victorians At War, 1815–1914: An Encyclopedia of British Military History. ABC-CLIO. ISBN 978-1576079256.
- Wilson, Frank (1956). Regiments at a Glance. Blackie.
