= Charles Bucke =

English writer

- Born: 16 April 1781; Worlington, Suffolk, England
- Died: 31 July 1846 (aged 65); Pulteney-terrace, Islington England
- Occupations: Poet, writer, Philosophical observer, playwright

Charles Bucke (16 April 1781 – 31 July 1846) was an English writer who, despite being poor most of his life, still managed to produce roughly eleven different works, each varying in number of volumes and topics.

== Life ==
Little is recorded concerning the life of Mr. Bucke, but he is remembered for his eloquence with nature writing and a dispute with the actor Edmund Kean. He worked for over thirty years on his publications, often recalling them repeatedly to re-edit them. This caused some of the same works to be published under different titles, most notably his two-volume series "The Philosophy of Nature, or the Influence of Scenery on the Heart and Mind", which he later expanded to four volumes under the title "On the Beauties, Harmonies, and Sublimities of Nature".

== Disputes with contemporaries ==
In the midst of writing, Mr. Bucke also clashed on occasion with fellow writers, and, in one instance, an actor, Edmund Kean. In the dispute with Kean, Mr. Bucke relates that in 1817 he submitted his play "The Italians, or; The Fatal Accusation" to the Committee of Management at Drury Lane where it was accepted and put on the bill for future performance. Upon the death of Princess Charlotte of Wales the theatre closed for three weeks out of respect and Bucke conceded his priority in favour of a play that was thought to better appeal to the feelings of the general public regarding the princess's death.

After various delays and assurances that the play was well-liked and would be performed, Kean made an offhand comment suggesting that one of the female supporting actors had a superior role than his and that his part should be rewritten to be more centre-stage, much to the surprise of Bucke. After speaking with the theatre management, the issue was pushed aside in favour of focusing on the current production of a play by Jane Porter, who Kean had a personal dislike for, that was to be shown in February 1819. The play was performed and, according to Bucke who was at opening night (and also according to popular media at the time), it was almost as if the entire production staff and actors were against the play's performance.

"Two scenes fell flat upon the stage during the performance, and presented a strangely confused spectacle of back lights, naked machinery, and more than the bustle of a ship's deck in a storm. But the greatest outrage was the behaviour of Mr. Kean. He went through his part, of course the principle one by many degrees, with as much slovenliness, as if he was merely rehearsing it. This was so palpable, that persons cried 'shame!' upon him from the pit."

— The Morning Herald, 15 February 1819

Despite a concerted effort by some of the actors, Porter's play was a devastating failure and was not repeated. Upon witnessing this spectacle and bearing in mind the strange reaction he'd received previously from Kean, he went back stage to the management and requested his play to be pulled. After being called back by the theatre's committee and the insistence of the theatre's benefactors that 'The Italians' still be performed, Mr. Bucke then later had it republished with a preface concerning the incident, including excerpts from correspondences between himself, the theatre, and Mr. Kean which was later challenged in two books, The Assailant Assailed and A Defense of Edmund Kean, Esq. The ending result was loss of face on both sides and the play being performed anyway on 3 April 1819 to disastrous results due to the sensationalism surrounding Kean's contempt for the play as well as his behaviour towards the production of Jane Porter's piece beforehand.

== Death ==
Charles Bucke died on 31 July 1846 at the age of 65, presumedly of natural causes, leaving behind a widow, two sons (the eldest recorded as being 'imbecile from birth') and two daughters

== Bibliography ==
- The philosophy of nature: or the influence of scenery on the mind and heart 2 vols, 1813; later 4 vols (under the title 'On the Beauties, Harmonies, and Sublimities of Nature', 1821)
- Amusements in retirement; or the influence of science, literature, and the liberal arts 1816
- The fall of the leaf, and other poems 1819
- The Italians, or; The Fatal Accusation 1819
- A classical grammar of the English language; with a short history of its origin and formation 1829
- Julio Romano, or the force of the passions: an epic drama in six books 1830
- On the life, writings, and genius of Akenside; with some account of his friends 1832
- The book of human character 2 vols, 1837
- A letter intended (one day) as a supplement to Lockhart's Life of Sir Walter Scott 1838
- The life of John, Duke of Marlborough 1839
- Ruins of Ancient Cities: with general and particular accounts of their rise, fall, and present condition 2 vols, 1840
