= Drury Drury-Lowe =

British Army general (1830–1908)

Lieutenant-General Sir Drury Drury-Lowe GCB
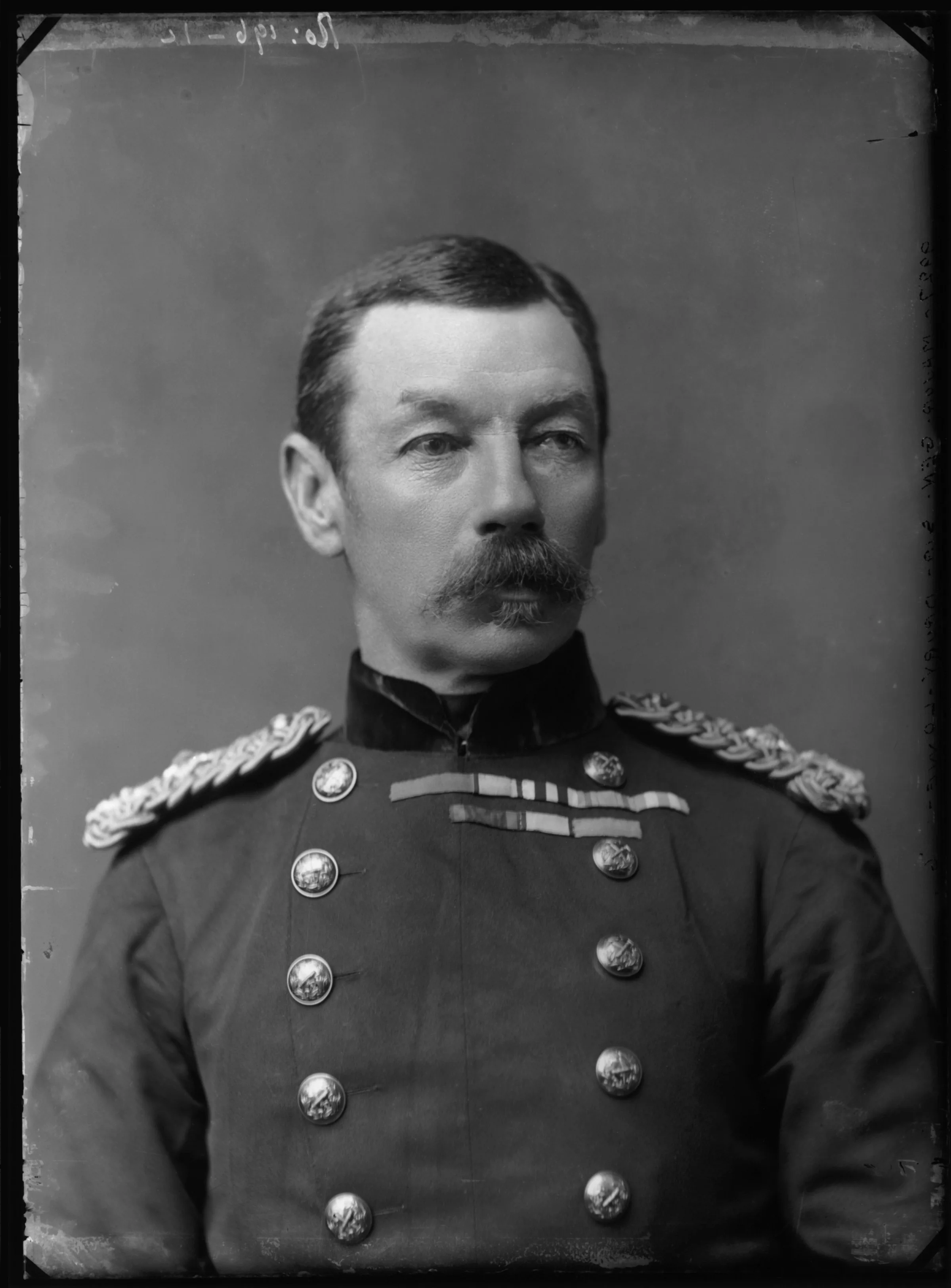
- Portrait by Alexander Bassano, 1883
- Born: Drury Curzon Holden; 3 January 1830; Aston-on-Trent, Derbyshire
- Died: 6 April 1908 (aged 78); Denby, England
- Military career
- Allegiance: United Kingdom
- Branch: British Army
- Service years: 1854–1895
- Rank: Lieutenant-General
- Unit: 17th Lancers (Duke of Cambridge's Own)
- Commands: Commander, 17th Lancers 1866–1878; Inspector of Cavalry at Aldershot 1885–1890; Colonel of the 17th Lancers 1892–1895
- Conflicts: Crimean War (1855–1856): Battle of Chernaya River, Siege of Sevastopol, Indian Mutiny (1858–1859), Anglo-Zulu War (1879): Battle of Ulundi. Anglo-Egyptian War (1882).
- Awards: GCB

Lieutenant-General Sir Drury Curzon Drury-Lowe GCB (3 January 1830 – 6 April 1908) was a British Army officer.

== Biography ==
He was born as Drury Curzon Holden on 3 January 1830 at Aston Lodge in Aston-on-Trent when he was called Drury Curzon Holden. His father was William Drury Holden and he changed his name to Lowe when he inherited the Locko Park inheritance.

He was educated privately at his home, Locko Park, near Spondon in Derbyshire, before graduating with a BA from Corpus Christi College, Oxford. He joined the 17th Lancers in 1854 as a Cornet. He was commissioned a Lieutenant in November 1854 and Captain in November 1856.

He served in the Crimean War at the Battle of Chernaya River and was at the Siege of Sevastopol when it fell. He also saw service in the Indian Mutiny in 1858–59. He purchased a commission as Major in 1862, and was promoted to Lieutenant-Colonel of the 17th Lancers in 1866. Sometime between 1862 and 1867, he assumed the surname Drury-Lowe in place of Lowe.

Drury-Lowe commanded the 17th Lancers for 12 years – most notably at the Battle of Ulundi, the last pitched battle of the Anglo-Zulu War. On 5 June 1879, he led the 17th Lancers into battle with Zulu irregulars as part of the Zungeni Mountain skirmish, during which his adjutant, Frederick John Cokayne Frith, was killed and the British had to withdraw. According to Private Miles Gissop, who served in the regiment, Drury-Lowe claimed: "You are all right men. You are all right, they are aiming over your heads" only a moment before a Zulu bullet struck Frith in the heart.

Drury-Lowe was appointed Companion of the Order of the Bath in 1879. In the 1882 Anglo-Egyptian War, he received the surrender of Urabi Pasha. He was publicly thanked in the House of Commons, and knighted on 18 November 1882. He was Inspector of Cavalry at Aldershot from 1885 to 1890. He was promoted to Lieutenant-General in 1890. He became Colonel of the 17th Lancers in 1892.

== Last years ==
Drury-Lowe retired in 1895 and was awarded the Knight Grand Cross of the Order of the Bath, and then resided at Keydell House, Horndean, occasionally writing to The Times. He died on 6 April 1908; his widow died on 17 January 1931.

== Notes ==
Honorary titles
Preceded by Henry Roxby Benson	Colonel of the 17th (Duke of Cambridge's Own) Lancers; 1892–1908	Succeeded by Thomas Cooke
