= Edmund Kean =

English actor (1787–1833)

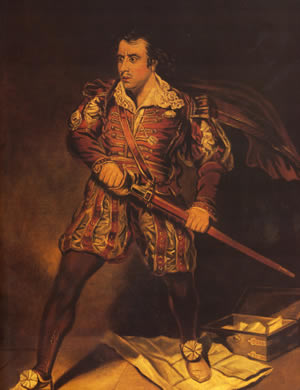
- Kean as Sir Giles Overreach in Massinger's A New Way to Pay Old Debts
- Born: 4 November 1787; Westminster, London, England
- Died: 15 May 1833 (aged 45); Richmond, Surrey, England
- Occupation: Actor
- Spouse: Mary Chambers
- Children: Charles Kean

Edmund Kean (4 November 1787 – 15 May 1833) was a British Shakespearean actor, who performed, among other places, in London, Belfast, New York, Quebec, and Paris. He was known for his short stature, tumultuous personal life, and controversial divorce.

== Biography ==
=== Early life ===
Kean was born in Westminster, London. His father was probably Edmund Kean, an architect's clerk, and his mother was an actress, Anne Carey, daughter of the 18th-century composer and playwright Henry Carey.

Kean made his first appearance on the stage at age four as Cupid in Jean-Georges Noverre's ballet of "Cymon." As a child, his vivacity, cleverness and ready affection made him a universal favourite, but his harsh circumstances and lack of discipline fostered self-reliance and wayward tendencies. About 1794 a few benevolent persons paid for him to go to school, where he did well; finding the restraint intolerable, however, he went to sea as a cabin boy at Portsmouth. Finding life at sea even more restricting, however, he pretended to be both deaf and lame so skillfully that he deceived the doctors at Madeira.

On his return to England, he sought the protection of his uncle, Moses Kean, a mimic, ventriloquist and general entertainer who, besides continuing his pantomimic studies, introduced him to the study of Shakespeare. At the same time, Charlotte Tidswell, an actress who had been especially kind to him from infancy, taught him the principles of acting.

On the death of his uncle, she took charge of him, and he began the systematic study of the principal Shakespearean characters, displaying the peculiar originality of his genius with interpretations entirely different from those of John Philip Kemble, then considered the great exponent of these roles. Kean's talent and interesting countenance caused a Mrs. Clarke to adopt him, but he took offence at the comments of a visitor and left her house suddenly, returning to his old surroundings.

=== Discovery ===
At age 14, he obtained an engagement to play leading characters for 20 nights in the York Theatre, appearing as Hamlet, Hastings and Cato. Shortly afterwards, while a member of Richardson's Theatre, a traveling theatre company, the rumor of his abilities reached George III, who commanded him to appear at Windsor Castle. He subsequently joined Saunders's circus, where in the performance of an equestrian feat he fell and broke both legs, the accident leaving traces of swelling in his insteps throughout his life.

At about this time, he picked up music from Charles Incledon, dancing from James Harvey D'Egville, and fencing from Henry Angelo. In 1807, he played leading parts in the Belfast theatre with Sarah Siddons, who began by calling him "a horrid little man." Upon further experience of his ability, she said that he "played very, very well," but that "there was too little of him to make a great actor." He made an early appearance with Mrs. Baker's company. In 1808, he joined the provincial troupe of the actor Samuel Butler, going on to marry Mary Chambers of Waterford, a leading actress, on 17 July. His wife gave birth to two sons, one of whom was the actor Charles Kean.

=== Drury Lane and New York ===
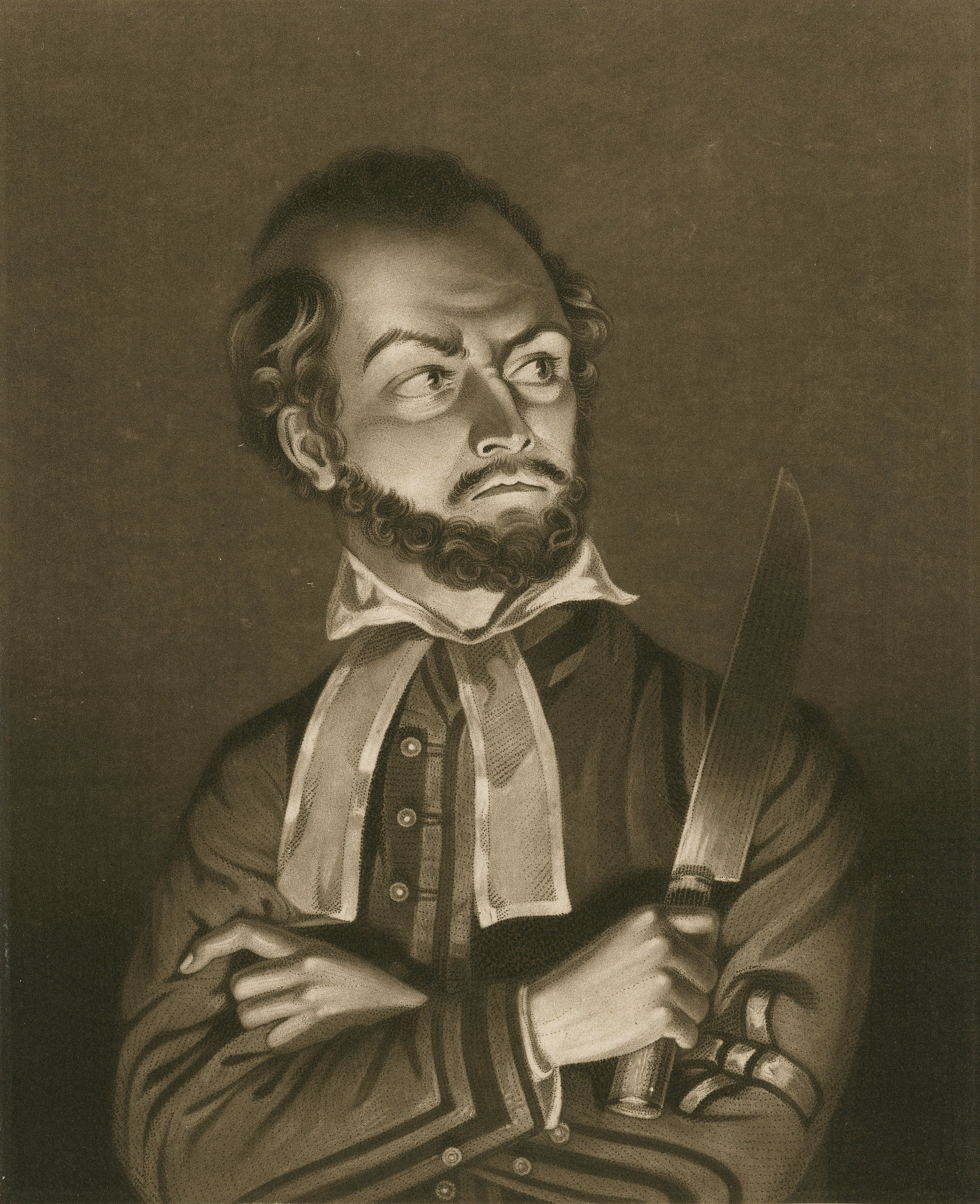
A print of Edmund Kean as Shylock in Shakespeare's The Merchant of Venice.

For several years his prospects were very gloomy, but in 1814 the committee of Drury Lane Theatre, which was on the verge of bankruptcy, resolved to give him a chance among the "experiments" they were making to win a return of their popularity. When the expectation of his first appearance in London was close upon him, he was so feverish that he exclaimed, "If I succeed I shall go mad." As he was unable to afford medical treatment for some time, his elder son died the day after he signed the three-year Drury Lane contract.

His opening at Drury Lane on 26 January 1814 as Shylock roused the audience to almost uncontrollable enthusiasm. Contemporaries recognized that Kean had brought dignity and humanity to his portrayal of the character. Jane Austen refers to his popularity in a letter to her sister Cassandra dated 2 March 1814: "Places are secured at Drury Lane for Saturday, but so great is the rage for seeing Kean that only a third and fourth row could be got." Successive appearances in Richard III, Hamlet, Othello, Macbeth and King Lear demonstrated his mastery of the range of tragic emotion. His triumph was so great that he himself said on one occasion, "I could not feel the stage under me."

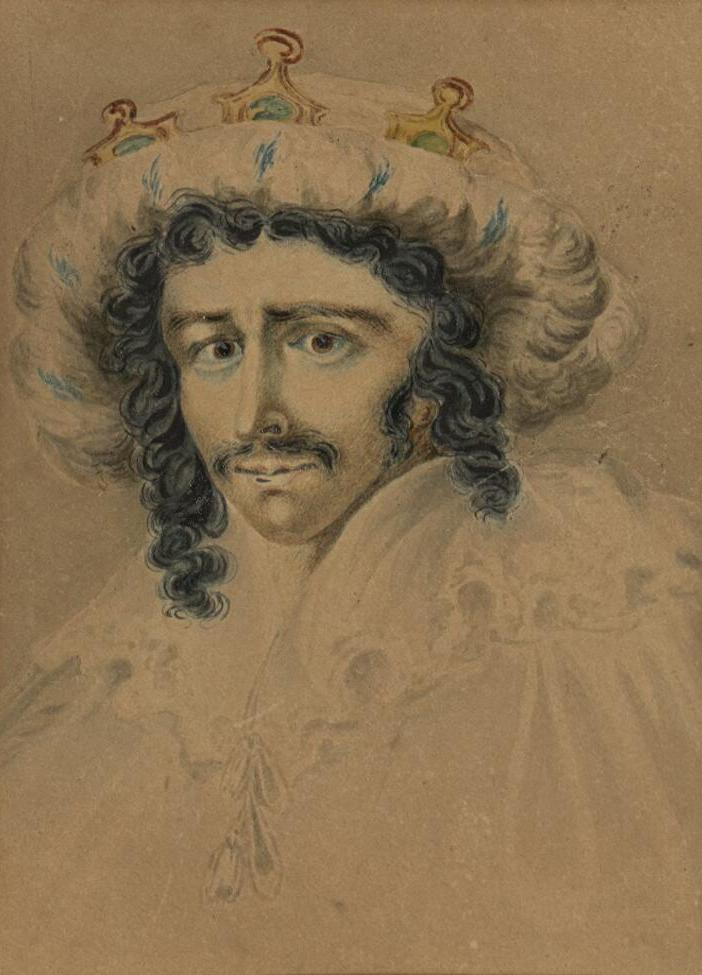
Portrait of Edmund Kean as Richard III

In 1817, a local playwright named Charles Bucke submitted his play The Italians, or; The Fatal Accusation to Drury Lane, for which Kean was to play the lead. The play was well received by both council and actors until Kean seemed to have a change of heart and began to make several offhand remarks that his part was not big enough for him. Then, after a performance in February 1819 where Kean went out of his way to botch the opening night of Switzerland, a play by historical novelist Jane Porter, for whom Kean had had a personal dislike, Bucke pulled the play out of contempt for Kean's conduct. After much cajoling by the theater staff to perform the play, Mr. Bucke then later had it republished with a preface concerning the incident, including excerpts from correspondence between the involved parties, which was later challenged in two books, The Assailant Assailed and A Defense of Edmund Kean, Esq. The result was loss of face on both sides, and the play being performed anyway on 3 April 1819 to a disastrous reception, thanks to the controversy already surrounding the play and Kean's previous conduct.

On 29 November 1820, Kean appeared for the first time in New York City as Richard III at the Anthony Street Theatre. The success of his visit to America was unequivocal, although he fell into a vexatious dispute with the press. In 1821, he appeared in Boston with Mary Ann Duff in The Distrest Mother by Ambrose Philips, an adaptation of Racine's Andromaque. On 4 June 1821, he returned to England.

Kean was the first to restore the tragic ending to Shakespeare's King Lear, which since 1681 had been replaced on stage by Nahum Tate's happy ending adaptation The History of King Lear. Kean had previously acted Tate's Lear, but told his wife that the London audience "have no notion of what I can do till they see me over the dead body of Cordelia." Kean played the tragic Lear for a few performances. They were not well received, though one critic described his dying scene as "deeply affecting"; with regret, Kean reverted to Tate.

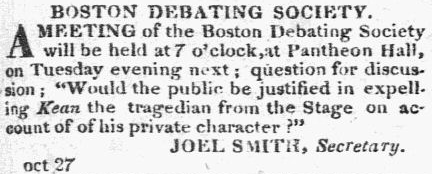
Newspaper notice for meeting of the Boston Debating Society: "Would the public be justified in expelling Kean the tragedian from the stage on account of his private character?" (October 1825)

=== Private life ===
Kean's lifestyle became a hindrance to his career. As a result of his relationship with Charlotte Cox, the wife of a City of London alderman, Kean was sued by Mr. Cox for damages for criminal conversation (adultery). Damages of £800 were awarded against him by a jury that had deliberated for just 10 minutes. The Times launched a violent attack on him. The adverse decision in the criminal conversation case of Cox v. Kean on 17 January 1825 caused his wife to leave him, and aroused against him such bitter feeling that he was booed and pelted with fruit when he re-appeared at Drury Lane, nearly compelling him to retire permanently into private life. For many years, he lived at Keydell House, Horndean. He also used Walnut Tree Cottage as his residence in the Middlesex village of North End, much closer to London.

=== Second American visit ===
A second visit to America in 1825 was largely a repetition of the persecution which he had suffered in England. Some cities showed him a spirit of charity, but many audiences subjected him to insults and even violence. In Quebec City, he was much impressed with the kindness of some Huron Indians who attended his performances, and he was purportedly made an honorary chief of the tribe, receiving the name Alanienouidet. Kean's last appearance in New York was on 5 December 1826 in Richard III, the role in which he was first seen in America.

=== Decline and death ===
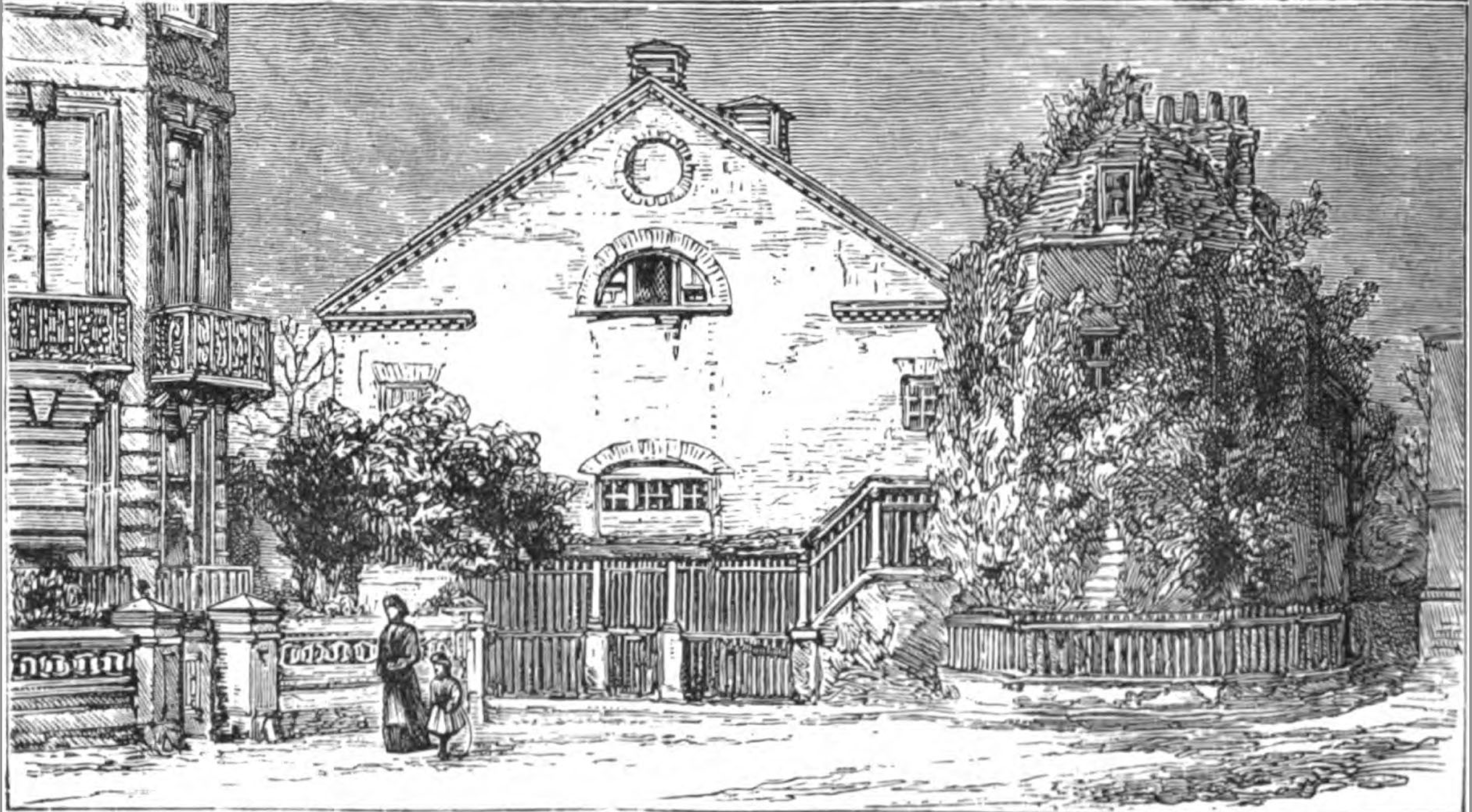
Exterior of the Richmond Theatre and Edmund Kean's House. Kean was manager of the Richmond Theatre from 1831 until his death in 1833.

He returned to England and was ultimately received with favour, but by now he was so dependent on the use of stimulants that the gradual deterioration of his gifts was inevitable. Still, his great powers triumphed during the moments of his inspiration over the absolute wreck of his physical faculties. His appearance in Paris was a failure owing to a fit of drunkenness. He appeared in the title part of Ben Nazir by Thomas Colley Grattan in 1827 as a comeback role at Drury Lane, but the play was not a success. He turned down Alfred the Great by James Sheridan Knowles, a role that went to William Macready He took over the management of the Richmond Theatre, Surrey in 1831, continuing in that role until his death two years later. He resided in a house next to the theatre.

His last appearance on the stage was at Covent Garden on 15 March 1833, when he played Othello to the Iago of his son, Charles Kean, who was also an accomplished actor. At the words "Villain, be sure," in scene 3 of act iii, he suddenly broke down, and crying in a faltering voice "O God, I am dying. Speak to them, Charles," fell insensible into his son's arms. He died a few weeks later in Surrey, and is commemorated in the Parish Church, where there is a floor plaque marking his grave, as well as a wall plaque that was originally on the outside, but was moved inside and heavily renovated during restoration work in 1904. He is buried in the parish church of All Saints, in the village of Catherington, Hampshire. His last words were alleged to have been "dying is easy; comedy is hard." In Dublin, Gustavus Vaughan Brooke took up the part of William Tell vacated by Kean.

== Artistic legacy ==
According to the Encyclopædia Britannica Eleventh Edition, it was in the impersonation of the great creations of Shakespeare's genius that the varied beauty and grandeur of the acting of Kean were displayed in their highest form, although probably his most powerful character was Sir Giles Overreach in Philip Massinger's A New Way to Pay Old Debts, the effect of his first performance of which was such that the pit rose en masse, and even the actors and actresses themselves were overcome by the terrific dramatic illusion. His main disadvantage as an actor was his small stature. Coleridge said, "Seeing him act was like reading Shakespeare by flashes of lightning."

== Eccentricity ==
His eccentricities at the height of his fame were numerous. For example, he chose his dinner according to the role he was to play: for a tyrant he would eat pork, for a murderer beef and for a lover mutton.

Sometimes he would ride recklessly on his horse, Shylock, throughout the night. He was presented with a tame lion with which he might be found playing in his drawing-room. The prize-fighters Mendoza and Richmond the Black were among his visitors and Henry Grattan was his devoted friend.

== Appraisals ==
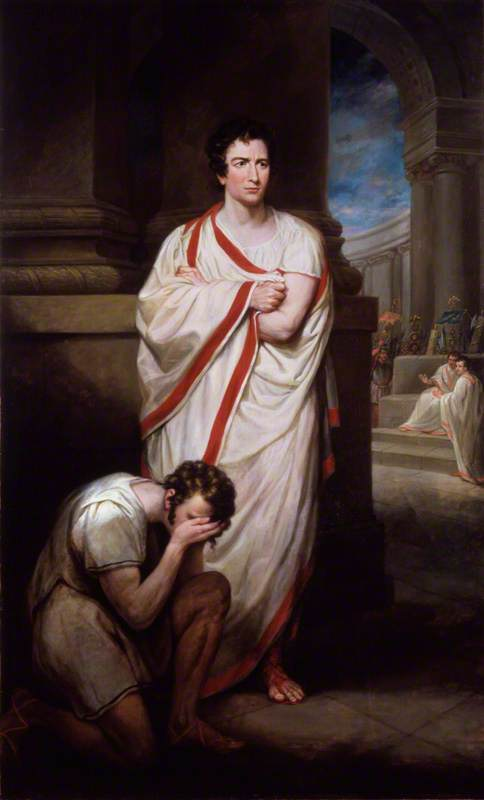
Edmund Kean as Brutus by James Northcote, 1819

In his earlier days, François Talma said of him, "He is a magnificent uncut gem; polish and round him off and he will be a perfect tragedian." William Macready, who was much impressed by Kean's Richard III and met the actor at supper, speaks of his "unassuming manner ... partaking in some degree of shyness" and of the "touching grace" of his singing. Kean's delivery of the three words "I answer—No!" in the part of Sir Edward Mortimer in The Iron Chest, cast Macready into an abyss of despair at rivalling him in this role. So full of dramatic interest is the life of Edmund Kean that it formed the subject for the play "Kean" by Jean-Paul Sartre as well as a play by Alexandre Dumas, entitled Kean, ou Désordre et génie, in which the actor Frédérick Lemaître achieved one of his greatest triumphs.

In 1924 director Alexandre Volkoff adapted the Dumas play into a French silent feature film starring Russian actor Ivan Mosjoukine, who was then living in Paris. Kean: Genius or Scoundrel (Italian: Kean - Genio e sregolatezza) co-written, directed by and starring Vittorio Gassman, is a 1956 Italian dramatization of the life of Kean. It is based on the drama play Kean (1836) by Alexandre Dumas and its 1953 adaptation by Jean-Paul Sartre. It was screened at the Locarno Film Festival in 1957. The film's sets were designed by the art director Gianni Polidori. Much of the film was shot at the Teatro Valle in Rome.

== Theatrical works ==
Several theatrical works have been based on Kean's life:

- Kean, a drama by Alexandre Dumas, père, 1836
- Kean, a comedy by Jean-Paul Sartre, 1953 (produced 1954 with Pierre Brasseur, revived London 1990 starring Derek Jacobi and in 2007 starring Antony Sher)
- Kean, a Broadway musical by Peter Stone, Robert Wright, and George Forrest, 1961
- Kean, 1978, a BBC Play of the Month with Anthony Hopkins
- Kean, 1983, a YTV biography with Ben Kingsley
- Kean IV, a tragicomedy by Grigoriy Gorin, 1991

== Cultural influence ==
The acclaimed latter 20th-century British theatre and film actor Peter O'Toole owned a finger-ring that had once belonged to Kean, and used it as a literary muse for the writing of the second volume of his autobiography Loitering with Intent: The Apprentice (1997). O'Toole delivered the line, "dying is easy; comedy is hard" and attributed it to the last words of Kean in the 1982 movie My Favorite Year.

== Sources ==
- Francis Phippen, Authentic memoirs of Edmund Kean, containing a specimen of his talent at composition (London, 1814)
- B. W. Procter, The Life of E. K. (London, 1835)
- Frederick William Hawkins, The life of Edmund Kean (Tinsley Brothers, London, 1869)
- George Henry Lewes, On Actors and the Art of Acting (Smith Elder, London, 1875)
- Henry Barton Baker Our Old Actors, (R. Bentley & Son, London, 1881)
- Edwin Booth, "Edmund Kean," in Actors and Actresses of Great Britain and the United States from the days of David Garrick to the present time, edited by Brander Matthews and Laurence Hutton, volume iii (Cassell & Co., New York, 1886)
- Joseph Fitzgerald Molloy, The Life and Adventures of Edmund Kean, Tragedian, 1787-1833 (Downey & Co. Limited, London, 1897)
- Edward Stirling, Old Drury Lane: Fifty Years' Recollections of Author, Actor, and Manager (Chatto and Windus, London, 1887).
- Lynch, Jack (2007). Becoming Shakespeare: The Strange Afterlife That Turned a Provincial Playwright into the Bard. New York: Walker & Co.
- Hillebrand, Harold Newcomb: Edmund Kean, New York, Columbia University Press, 1933
- Thomas Colley Grattan, "My Acquaintance with the Late Mr. Kean," in The New Monthly Magazine and Literary Journal, Volume 3, (1833)
