= Thomas Cooke (British Army officer) =

General Thomas Arthur Cooke CVO (1841–1912) was a British general whose career spanned the 19th and 20th centuries.

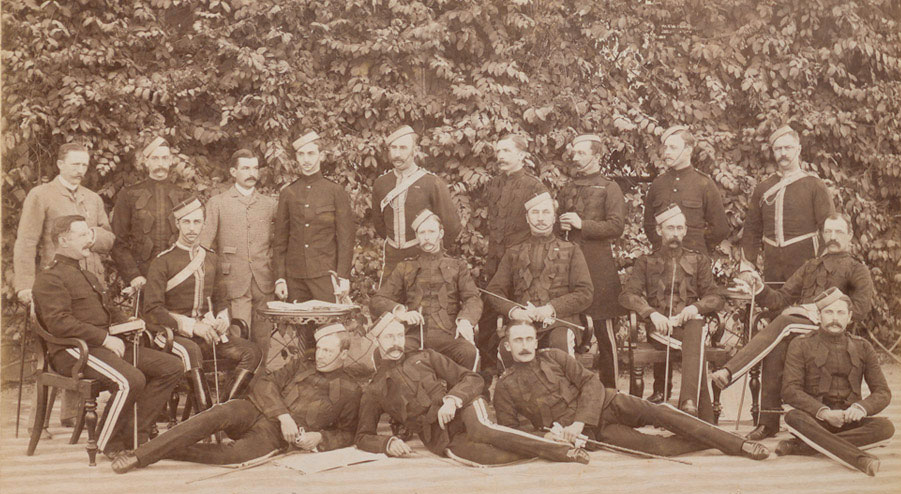
Officers of the 17th Lancers, Lucknow, India, November 1885. Sat in the middle row, third from the right, is Colonel Thomas A. Cooke.

Cooke was gazetted into the 5th Regiment of Foot in 1862 before transferring to the 17th Lancers in 1866. From here he rose steadily and was mentioned in dispatches during the Anglo Zulu War. He assumed command of the regiment in 1886 and subsequently served in India (where he was awarded the Kaisar-i-Hind Medal for public service as President of the Plague Committee). Promotion to the rank of major general followed on 23 May 1898.

In 1902 he was general officer in command of a camp which hosted many of the colonial troops visiting the United Kingdom for the Coronation of King Edward VII and Queen Alexandra, for which he was appointed a Commander of the Royal Victorian Order (CVO) two days after the ceremony, on 11 August 1902.

From 1906 to 1908 he was colonel of the 5th Royal Irish Lancers.

He was buried at Kensal Cemetery in a ceremony attended by many of his former comrades.

== Notes ==
Honorary titles
Preceded by Sir Drury Drury-Lowe	Colonel of the 17th (Duke of Cambridge's Own) Lancers; 1908–1912	Succeeded by Sir Douglas Haig
