= Richard Nelson Lee =

Richard Nelson Lee, known as Nelson Lee (8 January 1806 – 2 January 1872) was an English actor, theatre manager and writer of pantomimes and plays.

== Life ==
By his own account, Lee was born in Kew on 8 January 1806; it was the day of Nelson's public funeral, a circumstance to which he owed his second name. His father was Lieutenant-Colonel Richard Lee, of the 63rd Regiment of Foot.

He played as an amateur actor in Deptford, and learnt acting and juggling among travelling fairs in London. He was in what was called "utility" business at the old Royalty Theatre, practised legerdemain, and accompanied on tour Gyngell, a professional conjurer.

Lee joined in 1827 Robert William Elliston in his final occupancy of the Surrey Theatre. At the Surrey, under different managers, he remained for seven years, playing Harlequin in the Christmas pantomimes, which he wrote after Elliston's departure. For Yates and Mathews at the Adelphi Theatre he is said to have written in 1834 the pantomime Oranges and Lemons, in which in the course of one week he was seen as clown, Harlequin, and Pantaloon. In 1836 he managed Sadler's Wells Theatre.

On the death in 1836 of John Richardson, the proprietor of "Richardson's Show", Lee, with John Johnson of the Surrey Theatre, bought his business, which they conducted with success. In June 1838 he organized a fair in Hyde Park to celebrate the Coronation of Queen Victoria. Its great success made him known to the general public.

In connection with John Johnson, Lee managed the Marylebone, the Pavilion, the Standard, and finally the City of London Theatre, the direction of which they retained for fifteen years. After Johnson's death in 1864 Lee remained in management until 1867, when he retired, and afterwards confined his attention to miscellaneous entertainments at the Crystal Palace or elsewhere.

In 1866 he prepared an autobiography, which, like his other works, remained in manuscript. He wrote over two hundred pantomimes and plays, mostly for the East End theatres which he managed. The dramas consisted principally, if not entirely, of adaptations. Lee died at his home in Dalston, London, on 2 January 1872, and was buried in Abney Park Cemetery.

== Family ==
Lee married in 1838 Amelia Griffiths, and they had eight children; the eldest, Nelson J. Lee (1842–1923) was a writer of melodramas.
