= Joseph Malone (VC) =

Recipient of the Victoria Cross

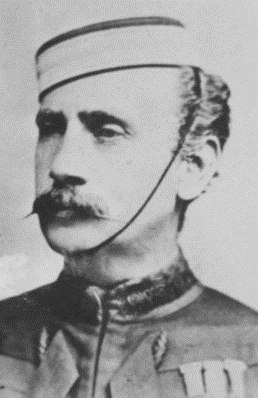
- Joseph Malone VC
- Born: 11 January 1833; Eccles, Lancashire
- Died: 28 June 1883 (aged 50); Pinetown, Natal Colony
- Burial place: St Andrew's Churchyard, Pinetown
- Military career
- Allegiance: United Kingdom
- Branch: British Army
- Rank: Captain
- Units: 13th Light Dragoons; 6th Dragoons
- Conflicts: Crimean War
- Awards: Victoria Cross

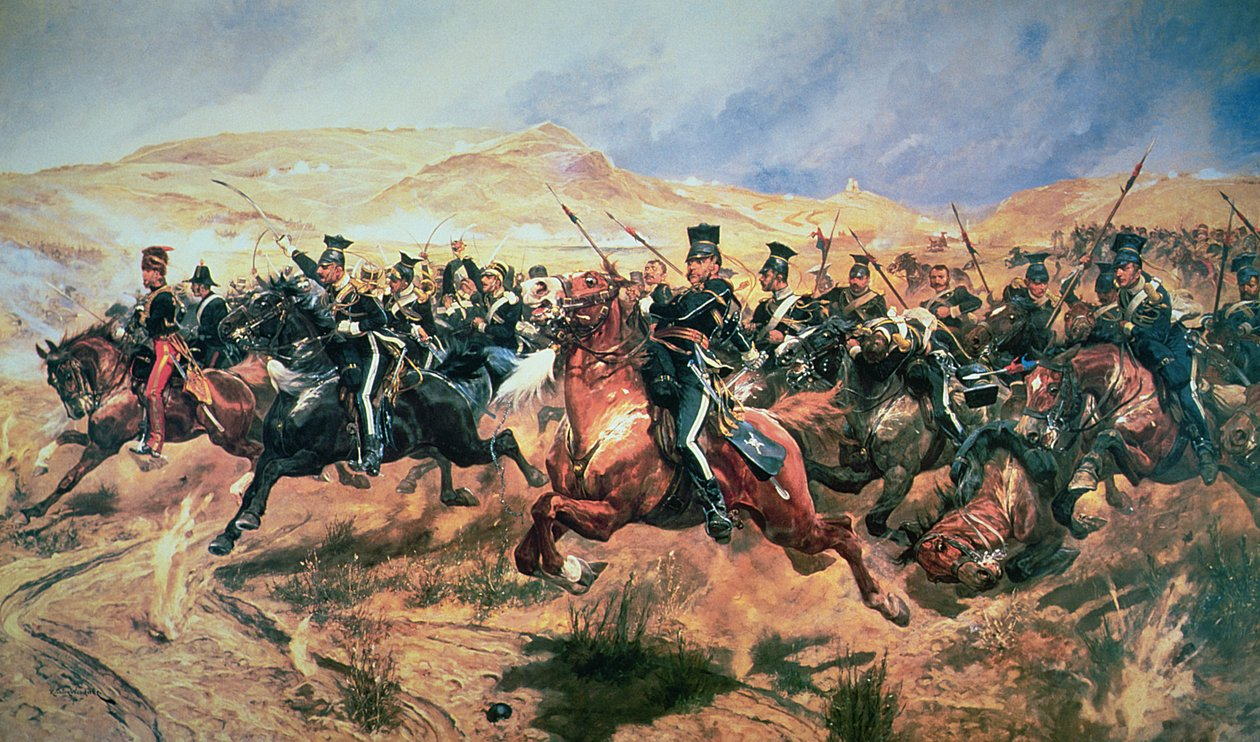
Charge of the Light Brigade, Balaclava, 25 October 1854 (Richard Caton Woodville Jr., 1894)

Joseph Malone VC (11 January 1833 – 28 June 1883) was an English recipient of the Victoria Cross, the highest and most prestigious award for gallantry in the face of the enemy that can be awarded to British and Commonwealth forces. Malone was born in Eccles, Lancashire on 11 January 1833. After working as a farrier, in March 1851 he enlisted in the 13th Light Dragoons (later 13th Hussars). In May 1854 he travelled with his regiment to the Crimea and served throughout the Crimean War.

== VC action ==
He was a 21 years old sergeant in the 13th Light Dragoons, British Army, during the Crimean War when the following deed took place for which he was awarded the VC.

On 25 October 1854 at Balaclava, Crimean Peninsula during the Charge of the Light Brigade, Sergeant Malone, while returning on foot from the charge, in which his horse had been shot, stopped under very heavy fire and helped a troop sergeant-major (John Berryman) and other sergeant (John Farrell) to move a very severely wounded officer (who subsequently died) out of range of the guns.

Malone was presented with his VC by Queen Victoria at Windsor Castle on 21 November 1857.

== Further career ==
After the war, Malone transferred to the 6th (Inniskilling) Dragoons and was commissioned as a Riding Master in 1858. After service in India and Ireland, in 1881 he along with other riding masters was granted the honorary rank of Captain.

In 1881 he sailed to the Cape Colony with his regiment. Here, despite suffering ill health, he was not invalided home as he only had one year left before retiring. Malone died at Pinetown on 28 June 1883, and was buried in the small cemetery in what was the old St Andrews churchyard. An account of his funeral reads: "His body was brought from the Rugby Hotel on a gun carriage drawn by soldiers, his horse led in front of it, his boots hanging reversed from the saddle, with his sword and knapsack rolled on it, the helmet resting on the coffin. The band played the Dead March and the men moved along the road slowly and majestically to the solemn sounds; and we children were moved to tears with the pathos and marvel of it all."

His Victoria Cross was acquired by Lord Ashcroft in 2017 and is held at the Imperial War Museum, London as part of the Lord Ashcroft VC collection.

He was the grandfather of Patricia Malone and great grandfather of Sally Ann Howes, both actresses.
