= Henry Roxby Benson =

British military officer (1818–1892)

General Henry Roxby Benson CB
- Born: 2 November 1818; Camberwell, Surrey
- Died: 23 January 1892 (aged 73); Fairyhill, Gower, Swansea
- Military career
- Allegiance: United Kingdom
- Branch: British Army
- Rank: General
- Unit: 17th Lancers
- Conflicts: Crimean War

Henry Roxby Benson CB (2 November 1818 – 23 January 1892) was a British military officer.

== Life ==
Benson was born on 2 November 1818, in Camberwell, to a distinguished Welsh family, the second son of merchant Thomas Starling Benson and his second wife, Elizabeth Meux, daughter of Richard Meux. Richard Meux Benson was his younger brother. He attended St. John's College, Cambridge.

He was gazetted into the 17th Lancers as a cornet on 31 January 1840 and rose steadily: lieutenant, 15 April 1842; captain, 27 June 1845 and major on 23 October 1854. He commanded the 17th Lancers in the Crimea from 14 January 1855, including at the Battle of the Tchernaya and the siege and fall of Sebastopol, and commanded the squadron of the Light Brigade in the night attack on the Russian outposts on 19 February 1855. For his service in the Crimea, he received the medal with clasp, the fifth class of the Order of the Medjidie, and the Turkish medal. On 30 September 1856, he was promoted to lieutenant-colonel of the 17th. Subsequent service in India (where he commanded the 2nd Cavalry at Malwa) lead to further promotions, notably Colonel of the 7th Hussars. Appointed CB in 1861 he continued to rise until his final promotion to the rank of General twenty years later.

== Family ==
Benson married in 1845 Mary Henrietta Wightman, second daughter of William Wightman the judge. Their son Henry Wightman Benson was also a distinguished officer. He was the third son, and like the second son William Denman, who was called to the bar, and the fifth son Florance John, studied at the University of Oxford.

Mary Henrietta's sister, Frances Lucy Wightman, married Matthew Arnold. The Arnold's daughter Eleanore Mary Caroline was married in 1889 to Armine Wodehouse, after her father's death, from a house taken by Benson in London.

== Notes ==
Honorary titles
Preceded by Charles Hagart	Colonel of the 7th (The Queen's Own) Hussars; 1879–1884	Succeeded by William Thomas Dickson
Preceded by John Charles Hope Gibsone	Colonel of the 17th (Duke of Cambridge's Own) Lancers; 1884–1892	Succeeded by Sir Drury Drury-Lowe
