= Gato =

Gato (Spanish for cat) or El Gato may refer to:

== Arts and entertainment ==
=== Fictional characters ===
- Anavel Gato, in the anime Mobile Suit Gundam 0083: Stardust Memory
- El Gato, in the novel Keeper by Mal Peet
- Poosy Gato, in comic strip Gordo
- the Gato, an artifact in the 2003 film The Rundown
- Gato, in the Fatal Fury video game series

=== Other uses in arts and entertainment ===
- Gato (artform), a style of Argentine music and an associated dance
- Gato (video game), 1984
- Il Gato, an American band

== Military ==
- Gato-class submarine, of the United States Navy, launched 1941–43
- USS Gato, the name of several submarines

== People ==
- Gato (given name), including a list of people with the given name or nickname
- Gato (surname), including a list of people with the surname

== Places ==
- Gato, Orocovis, Puerto Rico
- Gato Island, in the Visayan Sea, Philippines

== Other uses ==
- Gato (DeepMind), a deep neural network
- Gatos de Madrid, a Spanish rugby union franchise
- Elgato, a brand of consumer technology products

== See also ==
- El Gato Negro (disambiguation)
- Los Gatos (disambiguation)
- Gatto, surname
- Guato (disambiguation)
- Hombre Gato ('Cat Man'), a South American legendary creature
