= List of warships by nickname =

The following is a list of warships listed by nickname. See below for a key to abbreviations.

== A ==
- "Abe" – USS Abraham Lincoln' Abraham Lincoln is often informally referred to as "Abe" or "Stink'n Lincoln"
- "Ageless Warrior" – USS Coral Sea
- "Aggie" – HMS Agamemnon
- "Aggie on Horseback" – HMS Weston; nickname named for Agnes Weston, a temperance and sailor's advocate; "on horseback" is a jocular mistranslation of Latin "super-mare" ("on the sea"), "mare" being equated with a female horse
- "'A Gin Court" – HMS Agincourt; Battleship seized from Turkey in 1914; because of its luxurious Turkish outfit
- "Algonquatraz" – HMCS Algonquin (DDG 283)
- "'Amazing Grace" – USS Hopper (DDG 70); Named for USN Rear Admiral Grace Hopper, a pioneer of computer programming and author of COBOL
- "'Am and Tripe" – HMS Amphitrite; humorous malapropism
- "America's Favorite Carrier" – USS Carl Vinson
- "Angry Cat" – French ship Henri IV; named so by the British, a play on the pronunciation of "Henri Quatre"
- "Archdeacon" – HMS Venerable; a play on the phrase "venerable archdeacon"
- "Athabee" – HMCS Athabaskan (DDG 282)
- "Avenger of Pearl Harbor" – USS Cavalla (SS-224); known for sinking Japanese aircraft carrier Shōkaku which was a major participant in the Attack on Pearl Harbor.

== B ==
- "Babe Lincoln" – USS Abraham Lincoln; reference to her 1995 deployment, the first Pacific based carrier deployment where there were female crew members.
- "The Bat Mobile", "The Bat" - HMAS Vampire (D11); reference to the bat featuring on the ships badge
- "Battle Cat" – USS Kitty Hawk
- "Battle Schmoozer", "Belcrash" – USS Belknap; reference her collision with the USS Kennedy in 1975
- "Battle Barge" – USS Carl Vinson (CVN-70)
- "The Battleship of Presidents" – USS Iowa; reference to her carrying President F.D. Roosevelt.
- "Battle Star" – USS Carl Vinson (CVN-70)
- "Big Ben" – USS Franklin; the ship is named after Benjamin Franklin
- "Big D" – USS Dallas; given to the boat to denote being named in honor of the city of Dallas.
- "The Big E" – USS Enterprise (CV-6) and USS Enterprise (CVN-65)
- "The Big J" – USS New Jersey
- "Big John" – USS John F. Kennedy
- "Big Lizzie" – HMS Queen Elizabeth
- "Big Mamie" – USS Massachusetts
- "The Big Nasty" – USS Nassau
- "The Big Stick" – USS Theodore Roosevelt; based on Theodore Roosevelt's quotation, "Speak softly and carry a big stick". Also used for the USS Iowa during her third and final commissioning, c1980s Cold War. Iowa was nicknamed Mighty I during her first two commissionings in WWII and the Korean War.
- "Big Sugar" – USS Vermont
- "Big Gray Deuce" – USS Essex; humorous malapropism
- "Billy Ruffian" – HMS Bellerophon; humorous mispronunciation
- "The Black Dragon" – USS New Jersey
- "The Blue Ghost" – USS Lexington (CV-16); nickname supposedly bestowed by Japanese radio propagandist Tokyo Rose because of the color of her camouflage painting and because she repeatedly disproved reports that she had been sunk. Some crew used her predecessors nickname of "Lady Lex"
- "Bonnie" – HMCS Bonaventure
- "Bonnie Dick" – USS Bon Homme Richard CV/CVA-31 and USS Bonhomme Richard (LHD-6)
- "Buckin' Bronco" – USS Colorado (BB-45)
- "Building (hull number)" – a U.S. Navy joke about ships that don't go to sea much.
  - "Building 575" – USS Seawolf (SSN-575)
  - "Building 597" – USS Tullibee (SSN-597)
  - "Building 21" – USS Seawolf (SSN-21)
  - "Building 11" – USS Coronado (AGF-11)
  - "Building 5" – USS Vulcan (AR-5)
- "Bulldog of the Navy" – USS Oregon (BB-3)
- "The Big Risk" – USS Oriskany (CV-34)
- "Bag Lady" – USS Bagley (FF-1069); humorous malaproprism
- "Berzerkly" – USS Berkeley (DDG-15); humorous malaproprism
- "Broke" – USS Brooke (FFG-1); humorous malaproprism
- "Brand X" – USS Mississippi (CGN-40); reference to being the "copy" Virginia-class cruiser homeported out of Norfolk, VA

== C ==
- "C-ville" – USS Chancellorsville
- "Cancellation" - USS Constellation (FFG-62)
- "Cannabis" – USS Canopus; humorous malapropism
- "Can o' Pus" – USS Canopus (1980s reference to first 20% female crew.)
- "Can Opener" – USS John F. Kennedy, after collision with USS Belknap
- "Century One" – HMS Centurion; humorous malapropism
- "Charlie Love Five Five" – USS Cleveland (CL-55), nickname refers to the ship's hull symbol, CL-55.
- "Cheer Up Ship" – USS Nevada (BB-36)
- "Chesapeake Raider" – USS Wyoming (BB-32), nickname given after frequent sightings of the ship in the Chesapeake Bay during World War Two.
- "Christmas Anthem" – HMS Chrysanthemum; humorous malapropism
- "Chuck Bucket" – USS Carl Vinson
- "Chuckie V" – USS Carl Vinson
- "Cocoa Boat" – HMS Curacoa; humorous malapropism
- "Connie" – USS Constellation (CV-64); diminutive of ship's name
- "The Count" – USS Comte de Grasse; named for Comte de Grasse (French, "Count de Grasse"), an ally of the Americans in the American War of Independence
- "Curious" – HMS Furious
- "Cellblock 70" – USS Carl Vinson; humorous reference to restricted liberty for crew after incidents in Bremerton, WA, in the mid-1980s.

== D ==
- "Despair Ship Remorse" – HMS Resource; humorous malapropism on "Repair ship Resource"
- "Decrepit" – USS Intrepid
- "Dirty Cush" – USS Cushing
- "Dirty Two-Thirty" – HMCS Margaree (DDE 230) (decommissioned); from her hull number.
- "Dirty V" – USS Carl Vinson; humorous malapropism
- "Dreado" – HMS Dreadnought; diminutive of ship's name
- "Dull Ass" – USS Dallas; humorous malapropism
- "Dickover" – USS Hyman G. Rickover
- "Dickey B" – USS Richard B. Russell (SSN-687)
- "Dry I" – USS Intrepid
- "Dippity Do" – USS DuPont

== E ==
- "Eggshells" – HMS Achilles; humorous malapropism
- "Enterprison" – USS Enterprise; humorous malapropism
- "Evil I" – USS Intrepid
- "Excruciator" - HMS Excalibur; experimental & temperamental submarine fitted with dangerous hydrogen peroxide propulsion system.
- "Exploder" – HMS Explorer; experimental & temperamental submarine fitted with dangerous hydrogen peroxide propulsion system.

== F ==
- "The Fightingest Ship in the RCN" – HMCS Haida; gained this moniker by reason of sinking 14 enemy ships during patrols in the English Channel and the Bay of Biscay; she also sank more enemy surface tonnage than any other Canadian ship
- "The Fighting G" – HMS Gloucester
- "The Fighting J" – HMS Jamaica
- "The Fighting I" – USS Intrepid
- "The Fighting Lady" – USS Yorktown
- "The Fighting Sausage" – HMS Cumberland; from Cumberland sausage
- "Fighting Mary" – USS Maryland (BB-46)
- "Filthy Dirty Rusty" – USS Franklin D. Roosevelt; from her initials and advanced age late in her career
- "Firestal" – USS Forrestal
- "The Five Mile Sniper" – HMAS Brisbane
- "Flatiron" – HMS Argus; from the shape of the ship
- "Forrest Fire" "FID (First in Defense)" – USS Forrestal; humorous malapropism, also because of the fire on deck.
- "Foo-De-Roo" – USS Franklin D. Roosevelt
- "Fraser Blade" – HMCS Fraser
- "Freddy" – HMCS Fredericton
- "Fleet Starship" – USS Enterprise
- "The Furry Wet Mound" – USS Harry W. Hill (DD-986), humorous malapropism

== G ==
- "Galloping Ghost of the Java Coast" – USS Houston
- "George's Legs" or "Gorgeous Legs" – French light cruiser Georges Leygues
- "Germanclown" – USS Germantown (LSD-42)
- "Ghetto" – USS Gato
- "Gipper" – USS Ronald Reagan; named for Ronald Reagan's nickname, from his role of George "The Gipper" Gipp in the film Knute Rockne, All American.
- "Gin Palace" – HMS Agincourt; originally built for Brazilian Navy and given higher standards of comfort for officers, and lesser standards of comfort for the crew than most RN ships. Also a deliberate misspelling of the name: A Gin Court.
- "The Gold Eagle" – USS Carl Vinson
- "The Golden Devil" (Dutch "Den Gulden Duvel") – Sovereign of the Seas
- "The Golden Guad" – USS Guadalcanal (LPH-7)
- "Le Grand Hotel" – French Ironclad Hoche
- "The Grand Old Lady" – HMS Warspite
- "The Galloping Ghost" – USS Enterprise (CV-6)
- "The Gray Ghost" – USS Enterprise (CV-6)
- "The Gray Lady" – USS Lexington
- "The Gray Ghost" – USS Iowa (BB-61)
- "The Great White Ghost of the Arabian Coast/The Great White Whale" – USS La Salle (AGF-3)
- "Grey Ghost" – USS Pensacola; nickname given by Tokyo Rose
- "Greenpig" – USS Greenling
- "GW" – USS George Washington; initials of the ship's namesake

== H ==
- "The Ham" – USS Ingraham
- "Happy Valley" – USS Valley Forge
- "Hairy D" – HMCS Harry DeWolf
- "He-Cat" – HMS Hecate; humorous malapropism
- "HMAS Can Opener" – HMAS Melbourne; given by US Navy sailors for the ship's part in the sinking of the US Navy destroyer USS Frank E. Evans. Melbourne previously sank another destroyer, HMAS Voyager, in a similar collision.
- "HMS Me" – HMS Queen Elizabeth; from a cake presented to Elizabeth II during her first visit to the ship.
- "HMS Refit" – HMS Renown;
- "HMS Repair" – HMS Repulse
- "Hiroshima" – Soviet submarine K-19, due to a nuclear accident onboard
- "Hockey Puck" – USS Haleakala (AE-25); humorous malapropism
- "Holiday Express" – USS Bunker Hill
- "Holiday Inn" – USS Bunker Hill
- "Horny Maru" – USS Hornet
- "HST" – USS Harry S. Truman; initials of the ship's namesake Harry S. Truman
- "Hairy Ass" – USS Harry S. Truman; humorous malapropism
- "Hymi G" – USS Hyman G. Rickover
- "Happy Harry" – USS Harry W. Hill (DD-986)
- "Hotel Yamato" – Japanese battleship Yamato; due to the amount of time spent at Truk between August 1942 and May 1943

== I ==
- "Ike" – USS Dwight D. Eisenhower; based on nickname of namesake, Dwight D. Eisenhower
- "Ikeatraz" – USS Dwight D. Eisenhower; derogatory nickname given to those that served on board and had gotten in trouble in some way.
- "Indy" – USS Independence
- "Iron Duck" – HMS Iron Duke
- "Fighting I" – USS Intrepid
- "Ichiban Benjo Maru" – USS Ajax (AR-6); due to an outbreak of bacillary dysentery that required quarantine
- "Iron Woman" USS Cabot

== J ==
- "Jimmy K" – USS James K. Polk
- "Johnny Reb" – USS John C. Stennis

== K ==
- "Kaarnavene" – Finnish Navy Nuoli class fast gunboats. The name means literally "bark boat": they were made from non-magnetic mahogany.
- "Kami-ha-ha" – USS Kamehameha; humorous malapropism
- "King of Tomahawks" – USS John Young; probably after the ship's BGM-109 Tomahawk weapons system, or "The John Bone" humorous malapropisms
- "Shitty Kitty" – USS Kitty Hawk; humorous malapropism
- "Knockwood" – USS Lockwood

== L ==
- "Lady Lex" – USS Lexington
- "Lady Lou" – USS Louisville
- "Long Delayed" – HMAS Adelaide; rhyming play on ship's name. Fitting out and completion of the ship were delayed (almost 3 years) due to the loss of important machinery parts, as a result of enemy action, which gave rise to the nickname.
- "The Lord's Own" – HMS Vengeance; derived from the phrase "The Lord's own vengeance", based on the sentiment of Romans
- "Lost and Confused" – USS Lewis and Clark
- "Lucky A" – USS Alabama
- "Lucky E" – USS Enterprise (CV-6)
- "Lucky 26" – HNoMS Stord
- "Lusty" – HMS Illustrious
- "Lucky Number 7" – USS Rainier – The hull number.

== M ==
- "Maggie" – HMS Magnificent; HMCS Magnificent
- "The Mighty Hood" – HMS Hood
- "The Mighty I" – USS Iowa. Iowa was nicknamed Mighty I during her first two commissionings in WWII and the Korean War. Her nickname was changed during the Cold War c1980s, her final commissioning, to The Big Stick.
- "Mighty O" – USS Oriskany
- "Mighty T" – USS Texas (BB-35)
- "Mighty Y" – USCGC Yakutat
- "Mighty Mo" – USS Missouri
- "Mighty Moo" – USS Cowpens
- "Mighty Kay" – USS Kearsarge
- "Mobile Chernobyl" – USS Enterprise (CVN-65)
- "Moskvitch" – Finnish navy Tuima class missile boats. Soviet-built Moskvitch cars had notoriously poor reputation in Finland.
- "Motel 6" – USS Bonhomme Richard (LHD-6)
- "Midway Magic" – USS Midway (CV-41)

== N ==
- "Nasty Asty" – USS Astoria
- "Nasty Nick" – USS Nicholas, name given by crew due to the proclivity of the ship's AC units to break down in hot weather.
- "Nelly" – HMS Nelson – also "Nelsol" – from fleet oilers with names ending in "ol" that the Nelson class looked similar to in silhouette.
- "Niffy Jane" – HMS Iphigenia
- "NO Boat" – USS New Orleans
- "Northo" – HMS Northumberland

== O ==
- "O'Broken" – USS O'Brien
- "The O-Boat" – USS Oriskany
- "Old Bones" – Japanese battleship Kongō
- "Old Falling Apart" – USS Pennsylvania (BB-38), from firing so many rounds during the bombardment of Guam, she appeared to be falling apart.
- "Old Formy" – HMS Formidable
- "Old Hoodoo" – USS Texas (1892)
- "Old Mary" – USS Maryland (BB-46)
- "The Old Grey Ghost of the Borneo Coast" – HMS Albion
- "Old Ironsides" – USS Constitution
- "The Old Lady" – HMS Warspite, from a comment by Viscount Cunningham; impressed by the vintage ship's speed during a mission to aid the British Army in Sicily, Cunningham remarked, "When the old lady lifts her skirts she can run."
- "Old Lady of the Sea" – USS New York (BB-34)
- "Old Salt" – USS Nimitz
- "One-Eye" – HMS Polyphemus; Polyphemus was a cyclops in Greek mythology
- "Orjalaiva Kurjala" – Finnish Navy corvette Karjala. The word orjalaiva means slave ship in Finnish, while Kurjala references the Finnish word kurja ("miserable").
- "Outrageous" – HMS Courageous; humorous malapropism
- "The Oki Boat" – USS Okinawa

== P ==
- "Pepper Pot" – HMS Penelope – while docked in Valletta harbour, during the Siege of Malta, she was bombed so much she resembled a pepper pot
- "Pierwolf" – USS Seawolf
- "The Pool" – HMS Liverpool
- "Proud Pete" – USS Peterson; play on "Pete" as a diminutive of "Peterson", and on the ship's motto, "Proud Tradition"
- "Prune Barge" – USS California
- "Puffington" – HMS Effingham
- "Puuhamaa" – Finnish navy minelayer Pohjanmaa. An ironical remark of Puuhamaa amusement park.
- "Sweet Pea" – USS Portland
- "Pig Boat" – USS California; The resemblance of the bear on the ship's badge to that of a pig.
- "Pubic Mound" – USS Puget Sound; A play on words with a sound similar to Puget Sound.

== Q ==
- "Quarter-mile Island" – USS Enterprise (CVN-65) Reference to the ship's nuclear power plant and the 1979 accident at Three Mile Island nuclear station in Pennsylvania.
- "Queer Barge" – USS Kearsarge
- "Queerfish" – USS Queenfish
- "Quiet Warrior" – USS Spruance

== R ==
- "The Red-Eye" – HMCS Huron (DDG 281) (decommissioned); so named for the tobacco flower blossom on the ship's badge.
- "Refit" – HMS Renown
- "Repair" – HMS Repulse
- "Rezzo" – HMS Resolution
- "Rosie" – USS Franklin D. Roosevelt
- "Rough Rider" – USS Theodore Roosevelt
- "The Tiddly Quid" - (HMS Royal Sovereign)
- "Rodnol" – HMS Rodney – from fleet oilers with names ending in 'ol'
- "Ruosteensilmä" – Finnish Navy minelayer Ruotsinsalmi. The name means Rusty Eye in Finnish.
- "Rusty-guts" – HMCS Restigouche
- "Rusty W" – USS Washington

== S ==
- "Sara", "Super Sara", "Sorry Sara", "Sister Sara", "Stripe-Stack Sara", or "Sara Maru" – USS Saratoga
- "Saggy Pants" – HMCS Saguenay
- "Sally Rand" – HMCS St. Laurent (DDH 205) (decommissioned) nickname of several ships which have been named St. Laurent, of which HMCS St. Laurent DDH 205 was the most recent.
- "San Francisco's Own" – USS Carl Vinson; Name bestowed upon the ship by then-mayor of San Francisco Dianne Feinstein.
- "Seapuppy" – USS Seawolf
- "Shall Not Perish" – USS Abraham Lincoln
- "Shiny Sheff" – HMS Sheffield
- "The Shitty Dick" – USS South Dakota – nickname given by the crewmen of USS Washington, as a result of South Dakota having been given sole credit in the press for the victory at the Second Naval Battle of Guadalcanal.
- "Shitty Kitty" – USS Kitty Hawk
- "Showboat" – USS North Carolina
- "Sleek and Deadly Duck" – USS Donald B. Beary
- "Slack Jack" – USS John F. Kennedy
- "Smiley" – USS Jimmy Carter (SSN-23) – nickname of former US President Carter
- "The Smoke" – HMS London
- "Sodak" – USS South Dakota (BB-57)
- "USS Spring-a-leak" – USS Springfield (CLG-7) – for her alleged degraded engineering condition near the completion of her final deployment as Sixth Fleet Flagship (over 3 years)
- "Spurious" – HMS Furious
- "Starship Vinson" – USS Carl Vinson
- "Steel Cat" – HMAS Brisbane
- "Stinkin Lincoln" – USS Abraham Lincoln
- "Suckin' 60 From Dixie", or "Suckin' Sara" – USS Saratoga
- ”The Sum of all Fears” or “The Sum” for short - USS John C. Stennis Due to the aircraft carriers’ explosive appearance in the 2002 film, “The Sum of all Fears”, starring Ben Affleck and Morgan Freeman
- "Surunmaa" – Finnish navy corvette Turunmaa. Literally "land of sorrow".
- "Swanky Franky" – USS Franklin D. Roosevelt
- "Swayback Maru" – USS Salt Lake City
- "Stressex" – USS Essex; humorous malapropism
- "Steamin' Deuce" – USS Essex; humorous malapropism
- "Slimey Lymie" – USS Lyman K. Swenson
- "Saint Pauline" – USS Saint Paul; Humorous malapropism
- "The Stain" – USS Stein
- "Special K" – USS Kawishiwi
- "San Jack" or "Flagship of the Texas Navy": USS San Jacinto.
- "Triple Sticks" – USS Spruance

== T ==
- "T2" – USS Tullibee – This nickname was used to identify the second ship named Tullibee (SSN 597) from the first Tullibee (SS 284).
- "T.R." – USS Theodore Roosevelt
- "Tea Boat" – HMS Ceylon
- "Tea Chest" – HMS Thetis
- "Teacup" – USS Tecumseh
- "Teddy Ruxpin" – USS Theodore Roosevelt
- "Tico" – USS Ticonderoga
- "Tiddly Quid" – HMS Royal Sovereign. Both quid and sovereign are synonymous to pound sterling.
- "Tin Duck" – HMS Iron Duke
- "Three-Quarter Mile Island" – USS Enterprise (CVN-65) (a pun on Three Mile Island)
- "The Toothless Terror" – HMS Scylla. Armed with 4.5-inch guns rather than the designed 5.25-inch guns
- "Toasted O" – USS Oriskany
- "Traffie" – HMS Trafalgar
- "Trawler Mauler" – HMCS Nipigon – stems from an incident in the late 1980s when Nipigon sank a civilian fishing trawler for being a hazard to shipping
- "Tullibeast" – USS Tullibee
- "The Tartan Terror" – HMAS Stuart
- "Tottenham" – HMS Hotspur. After football team Tottenham Hotspur.
- "Tupperware" – HMS Wilton. First warship to be constructed from Glass-reinforced plastic.
- "Tuska class" – Finnish navy Tuima class missile boats. Tuska means "agony" in Finnish.
- "Tortanic" – USS Tortuga (LSD-46)
- "Top Gun" – USS Ranger (CV/CVA-61)

== U ==
- "Uproarious" – HMS Glorious

== V ==
- "VDQ" – NCSM Ville de Québec. Note that as a designated French-language unit, she properly uses the title Navire canadien de Sa Majesté (NCSM), which is the French translation of Her Majesty's Canadian Ship (HMCS)).
- "Von Stupid" – USS Von Steuben
- "Vince" – HMS Invincible
- "Vinny" – USS Vincennes (CA-44)

== W ==
- "Wee Vee" – USS West Virginia
- "Wet Ass Queen" – HMCS Wetaskiwin
- "Winter Pig" – HMCS Winnipeg
- "Wisky" – USS Wisconsin
- "Wicked Witch of the West" – USS Wichita

== Y ==
- "The Y" – USCGC Yakutat

== Z ==
- "Zippo" – USS Forrestal
- "Zoo (The) – USS Kalamazoo
- "Big Z" - USS Zumwalt

== Abbreviations ==
- NCSM – "Navire canadien de Sa Majesté"; applied to Royal Canadian Navy and Canadian Forces vessels designated as French-language units.
- HMAS – "His/Her Majesty's Australian Ship"; applied to Royal Australian Navy vessels
- HMCS – "His/Her Majesty's Canadian Ship"; applied to Royal Canadian Navy and Canadian Forces vessels
- HMNZS – "His/Her Majesty's New Zealand Ship"; applied to Royal New Zealand Navy vessels
- HMS – "His/Her Majesty's Ship"; applied to Royal Navy vessels
- USS – "United States Ship"; applied to United States Navy vessels

== See also ==
- List of nicknames of British Army regiments
- Lists of nicknames – nickname list articles on Wikipedia
- Nicknames of U.S. Army divisions
- Regimental nicknames of the Canadian Forces
