= Black Cat =

Black Cat or variants may refer to:

- Black cat, a cat with black fur.

== Arts and entertainment ==
=== Fictional characters ===
- Black Cat (Harvey Comics), a comic book character published from 1941 to 1951
- Black Cat (Marvel Comics), a comic book character first published in 1979
- Black Cat pirates, a group of characters in One Piece media

=== Film ===
- Black Cat Films, a series of short films made starting in 1916 by Essanay Studios
- The Black Cat (1934 film), an American horror film starring Bela Lugosi and Boris Karloff
- The Black Cat (1941 film), an American comedy/horror film starring Basil Rathbone and Bela Lugosi
- Black Cat, a 1959 Indian Hindi-language film starring Balraj Sahni
- "The Black Cat", a segment of the 1962 AIP anthology horror film Tales of Terror
- The Black Cat (1981 film) (Gatto nero), an Italian film by Lucio Fulci
- The Black Cat or Il gatto nero, a 1989 Italian film starring Urbano Barberini
- "The Black Cat", a segment of the 1990 Italian anthology horror film Two Evil Eyes, directed by Dario Argento
- Black Cat (1991 film), a Hong Kong film starring Jade Leung and Simon Yam
- The Black Cat, a 1995 British horror film by Rob Green
- Black Cat (2007 film), an Indian Malayalam-language film by Vinayan

=== Television ===
- "The Black Cat" (Masters of Horror), a TV episode
- "The Cat"/"The Black Cat"]], a Spider-Man: The Animated Series episode, 1994

=== Literature ===
- "The Black Cat" (short story), by Edgar Allan Poe
- Black Cat (manga), a Japanese manga series later adapted into an anime
- The Black Cat (Canadian magazine), a 1970 Canadian fantasy magazine
- The Black Cat (US magazine), a late 19th- and early 20th-century American literary magazine
- Black Cat, a 2004 novel by V. C. Andrews
- The Black Cat, a 2010 novel by Martha Grimes

=== Music ===
==== Groups ====
- Black Cats (band), a US-based Persian pop band
- The Black Cats, an American band led by Johnny Thunders for the 1985 album Que Sera Sera

==== Albums ====
- The Black Cat!, a 1970 album by Gene Ammons
- Kara Kedi ('Black Cat'), a 2010 album by Serdar Ortaç
- Black Cat (Never Shout Never album), 2015
- Black Cat (Zucchero album), 2016

==== Songs ====
- "Black Cat" (song), a 1989 song by Janet Jackson
- "Black Cat", a song by Broadcast from Tender Buttons
- "Black Cat", a song by Cacophony from Go Off!
- "Black Cat", a song by Gentle Giant from Acquiring the Taste
- "Black Cat", a song by Ladytron from Velocifero
- "Black Cat", a song by the Living End from State of Emergency
- "Black Cat", a song by Mayday Parade from A Lesson in Romantics
- "Black Cat", a song by Turbo
- "Black Cat", a song by Ziggy Marley from Love Is My Religion

== Businesses and organizations ==
=== Businesses ===
- Black Cat, an imprint of the publisher Grove Press
- Black Cat, a brand of cigarettes by the Carreras Tobacco Company

=== Organizations ===
- 13 Black Cats, or the Black Cats, a 1920s professional stunt flying group
- Black Cat group, a counter-insurgency militant group in Sri Lanka 1989-1993
- BlackCat (cyber gang), a ransomware hacker group
- Black cat, an anarcho-syndicalist symbol
- National Security Guard, or Black Cats, a counter-terrorism force in India
- Sunderland A.F.C., or The Black Cats, an English football club

=== Venues ===
- Black Cat (Washington, D.C., nightclub), US
- Black Cat Bar, in San Francisco, California, US
- Black Cat Cafe, former music venue in Fitzroy, Melbourne, Australia (now a bar)
- Black Cat Tavern, in Los Angeles, California, US

== Military ==
- Black Cat (aircraft), an American B-24 bomber shot down in World War II
- Black Cats (Royal Navy), the Royal Navy's helicopter display team
- Black Cat Squadron, of the Republic of China Air Force
- 13th Armored Division (United States), The Black Cats, a division of the U.S. Army in World War II
- Consolidated PBY Catalina, an American flying boat, nicknamed Black Cat when painted black during World War II

== Other uses ==
- Black Cat (wrestler) (Victor Manuel 1954–2006), Mexican wrestler
- Black Cat roundabout, a road intersection in the United Kingdom
- Ora Black Cat, a Chinese battery electric city car

== See also ==
- El Gato Negro (disambiguation)
- Chat Noir (disambiguation)
- Kuroneko (disambiguation)
- Black cat analogy, an analogy accounting for the differences between science and religion
- Chorny Kot (Black Cat), a German-trained Belarusian guerrilla unit during World War II
