= Kuroneko (disambiguation) =

Kuroneko is a 1968 Japanese horror film.

Kuroneko (Japanese: 黒猫 'black cat') may refer to:

- Kuroneko (singer), lead singer of Onmyo-Za
- Kuroneko-sama, a character from Trigun
- Ruri Gokō, nicknamed Kuroneko, a character from the light novel, manga, and anime series Oreimo
- Misaki Ohata (born 1989), ring name Kuroneko, a Japanese professional wrestler
- Yamato Transport, colloquially referred to as Kuroneko

== See also ==
- Black Cat (disambiguation)
- Neko (disambiguation)
