= List of nicknames of United States Army divisions =

Many Army divisions have over the years earned nicknames. Sometimes, the nicknames themselves have overshadowed the actual name of the division, such as the "Screaming Eagles" for the 101st Airborne Division.

== Special designation ==
An official special designation is a "nickname granted to a military organization" which has been authorized by the Center of Military History and recognized through a certificate signed by the Secretary of the Army.

A division's nickname may derive from numerous sources:

- it may be inspired by the division's badge or insignia, such as the 1st Infantry Division's "Big Red One". On the other hand, some division's badges are actually suggested by the nickname, such as the "CY" patch of the "Cyclone Division" (38th Infantry Division);
- it may derive from the place where the division was raised or trained (36th Infantry Division, "Texas"), or the places of origin of the division's soldiers (29th Infantry Division, "Blue and Gray", for northern and southern states);
- it may be bestowed by the enemy in battle, such as the moniker "Red Devils", a nickname for the 5th Infantry Division "granted" by the Germans at the Battle of Saint-Mihiel, World War I;
- it may be the pairing of an adjective (such as "Fighting") paired with the division's ordinal, such as "The Fighting First" for the 1st Infantry Division; or
- it may defy accurate explanation (albeit not without numerous theories), such as the 9th Infantry Division, or "Old Reliables".

Active divisions are listed in boldface; no distinction has been made between regular Army divisions and those of the Army Reserve or National Guard. The origin of the nickname is noted where possible. In some cases, the nickname was officially adopted by the division in question; this is indicated along with date of adoption (where known). Official status might also be inferred by the presence of the nickname on official distinctive unit insignia or in official military source materials.

== Airborne divisions ==
- 11th Airborne Division – "The Angels"; possibly after their shoulder patch, a white-bordered red circle with a white numeral "11", with white wings rising obliquely from the circle, all on a royal blue field
- 13th Airborne Division – "Golden Unicorns"; taken from their shoulder patch, a winged unicorn in orange on an ultramarine blue, the branch of service colours of the United States Army Air Corps, was approved on 2 June 1943. A gold on black "Airborne" tab was worn above the insignia.
- 17th Airborne Division – "Golden Talon"; taken from their shoulder patch.
- 173rd Airborne Brigade – "Sky Soldiers"; "The Herd". They received their official nickname (Tien Bing translates to Sky Soldiers) from the Taiwanese locals during exercises when they were parachuting in Taiwan. The 173rd was part of the only major conventional airborne operation (Operation Junction City) during the Vietnam War. The unit's shoulder patch was referred to as the "Flying Butter Knives."
- 82nd Airborne Division – "America's Guard of Honor", "All-Americans"; original members of the division in 1917 came from every state in the Union. In addition, the 82nd Airborne has been called "Alcoholics Anonymous" or "Almost Airborne" in reference to the "AA" on its shoulder patch by members of other divisions.
- 101st Airborne Division – "The Screaming Eagles"; after their shoulder insignia, a bald eagle's head on a black shield. During the Vietnam War, the nicknames "Puking Buzzards" and "One 'o Worst", a comment on their mode of transportation and a play on the official divisional name, were used. Both were used derogatorily by other soldiers, and were not used by the division itself. In addition, the Vietnamese called them the "Chicken Men" since they had never seen a bald eagle. Several regiments within the 101st were nicknamed "The Battered Bastards of Bastogne", due to their part in holding the important crossroads town during the Battle of the Bulge.

== Armored divisions ==
- 1st Armored Division – "Old Ironsides" (official, 1941); Devised by its first commander, Major General Bruce Magruder, after he saw a picture of the USS Constitution, which bears the same nickname. The "Dorito"
- 2nd Armored Division – "Hell on Wheels"; Brigadier General George S. Patton, while witnessing it on maneuvers in 1941, reportedly said the division would be "Hell on Wheels" when it met the enemy
- 3rd Armored Division – "Spearhead"; in recognition of the division's role as the "spearhead" of many attacks during the liberation of France in 1944.
- 4th Armored Division
  - "Breakthrough" – According to the Center of Military History, the 4th was "sometimes called the 'Breakthrough Division,' but the division never officially pursued the designation, preferring to be 'known by its deeds alone.'"
  - "Name Enough"
  - "Rolling Fourth"
  - "Patton's Best"
- 5th Armored Division – "Victory"; probably from the Roman numeral 5, which is a "V" (for "Victory").
- 6th Armored Division – "Super Sixth"
- 7th Armored Division – "Lucky Seventh"
- 8th Armored Division
  - "Thundering Herd"
  - "Iron Deuce"
  - "Iron Snake"
  - "Show Horse"
  - "Tornado"
- 9th Armored Division –
  - "Phantom"; so dubbed by the German army at the Battle of the Bulge because, according to the United States Holocaust Memorial Museum, the division "seemed, like a phantom, to be everywhere along the front."
  - "Remagen"; because the division captured intact the Ludendorf Bridge at Remagen, Germany; the first bridge across the Rhine River captured by the Allies.
- 10th Armored Division – "Tiger Division"; so named by Major General Paul Newgarden, the division's first commander, because a tiger has soldierly qualities, including being clean and neat and the ability to maneuver and surprise his prey.
- 11th Armored Division – "Thunderbolt"
- 12th Armored Division – "Hellcat Division" "Suicide Division" The Mystery Division"
- 13th Armored Division – "Black Cat"
- 14th Armored Division – "Liberators"; earned during the last days of World War II when it liberated some 200,000 Allied prisoners of war from German prison camps.
- 20th Armored Division – "Armoraiders"; not official, but the division did associate itself with this nickname while in training at Camp Campbell during World War II
- 27th Armored Division – "Empire"; referring to the fact that it was a New York National Guard unit, after the state's nickname.
- 30th Armored Division – "Volunteers"; referring to the fact that it was a Tennessee National Guard unit, after the state's nickname.
- 40th Armored Division – "Grizzly"; referring to the fact that it was a California National Guard unit, after the state's nickname.
- 48th Armored Division – "Hurricane"
- 49th Armored Division – "Lone Star"; referring to its status as a Texas National Guard formation, after the state's nickname.
- 50th Armored Division – "Jersey Blues"; referring to the fact that it was a New Jersey National Guard unit. This is today's 50th Infantry Brigade Combat Team.

== Cavalry divisions ==
- 1st Cavalry Division – "The First Team" "Hell for Leather" (see: https://archive.org/details/gov.dod.dimoc.20366), "The Black Horse"

== Infantry divisions ==
"The Big Red One" of the 1st Infantry Division.

- 1st Infantry Division
  - "The Big Red One" – from the division's official shoulder patch: Red numeral "1" on an olive drab shield.
  - "The Fighting First"
  - "The Big Dead One"
- 2nd Infantry Division
  - "Warrior Division" – official nickname
  - "Indian Head" – Official as of 1948. From the shoulder patch: an Indian head on a white star superimposed on black shield.
- 3rd Infantry Division
  - "Rock of the Marne" and "Marne Men" – earned for the Battle of the Marne during World War I, when the division held its position and repulsed two German divisions.
  - "Blue and White Devils" (German: "blau-weiße Teufel") – during the Battle of Anzio during World War II, the division was called this nickname by their German opponents, based on their shoulder patch (a square containing three diagonal white stripes on a dark blue field).
  - "Broken Television" – from their shoulder patch resembling a television with static on screen.
  - "Dog Faced Soldiers" – from the 3rd ID Song.
- 4th Infantry Division
  - The division's patch is four ivy leaves pointing up, down, and to the sides
  - "Ivy" – play on the Roman numeral "IV" ("4"). Also, ivy leaves are symbolic of tenacity and fidelity, the basis of the division's motto, "Steadfast and Loyal".
  - From the Vietnam Era "Funky Fourth". "Poison Ivy".
  - "Iron Horse" – official nickname, has been recently adopted to indicate the speed and power of the division
  - "Famous Fighting Fourth"
  - "Lost Lieutenants" or "4 Lieutenants Pointing North" – a play on the division shoulder sleeve insignia and the stereotype of 2nd Lieutenants being inexperienced and unskilled.
- 5th Infantry Division
  - "Red Diamonds" – a plain red diamond or lozenge shape
  - "Red Devils" – during the Battle of Saint-Mihiel in World War I, the Germans referred to the division as "Die roten Teufel" (German, "The Red Devils").
- 6th Infantry Division
  - The division's patch is a red six-pointed star
  - "Sightseeing Sixth"
  - ”Death Star”
  - ”Commie Jew Division” (as described by General William Westmoreland when it was proposed the 6th Division would be sent to Vietnam)
  - ”Jumping Jews” (when worn with an Airborne tab, 1/501 PIR in the 1990s)
- 7th Infantry Division
  - "Bayonet Division" – this nickname "became synonymous with the division through its participation in the Korean War and symbolizes the fighting spirit of the men of the 7th Infantry division."
  - "H-Hour" – Shoulder patch: Red circular patch bearing black hour glass which is formed by an inverted "7" and a superimposed "7".
  - ”The Crushed Beer Can”
- 8th Infantry Division
  - "Golden Arrow" – Official as of 1948. Shoulder patch: An upward pointing gold arrow piercing a silver figure "8" on a blue shield.
  - "Pathfinder Division" – Official; original nickname (supplanted by "Golden Arrow" and later reinstated), so named in honor of John C. Fremont, an explorer of California, the namesake of Camp Fremont, which is where the division was formed.
  - ”The Eight-Up Division” (play on words and the design of the patch alluding to the Army term “ate up” which means incompetent)
- 9th Infantry Division
  - "Varsity"
  - "Old Reliables" – origin unknown, but some possibilities recorded here
  - "Psychedelic Cookie" – Used during the Vietnam War in reference to its shoulder patch.
- 10th Mountain Division
  - "Mountaineer"
  - ”Fighting Beer Keg”
- 12th Infantry Division
  - "Carabao"
- 23rd Infantry Division
  - "Americal" – At one point in time this was the official Divisional designation, when it was redesignated as the 23rd Infantry Division, Americal became the divisional nickname. Originally formed in World War II out of separate American National Guard units on the island of New Caledonia, hence the origin of the name.
- 24th Infantry Division
  - "Pineapple Division"**"Taro Leaf"; "Victory".
- 25th Infantry Division
  - "Tropic Lightning" – Official (adopted August 3, 1953). In 1942 the division was ordered to deploy to Guadalcanal to relieve U.S. Marines there; only 31 days were required to accomplish the mission and earned the division its official designation. The Division patch is a taro leaf (indicating Hawaii, where the division was formed), and a lightning bolt, "representative of the manner in which the Division performs its allotted assignments."
  - "Electric Strawberry" – so called because the shoulder patch taro leaf resembles a strawberry with a lightning bolt on it.
- 26th Infantry Division – "Yankee"; This is today's 26th Maneuver Enhancement Brigade.
- 27th Infantry Division – "Empire," a legacy of the 27th Armored Division.
  - "O'Ryan's Roughnecks," a reference to the first division commander, John F. O'Ryan.
  - "New York Division." – Many members were part of the New York National Guard.
  - The abbreviation N.Y.D. can be seen in the division shoulder sleeve insignia. “Orion Division”, as the insignia also contains an "O" for O'Ryan, as well as a depiction of the Orion constellation as a pun on O'Ryan's name. This is today's 27th Infantry Brigade Combat Team.
- 28th Infantry Division
  - "Keystone" – The badge is a red keystone; the division was formed in Pennsylvania, the "Keystone State"
  - "Bloody Bucket" – So called by German soldiers World War II because the keystone shaped patch was red and resembled a bucket, in German, Der Blutige Eimer.
  - "Iron Division" – From a comment by John J. Pershing following the 1918 Battle of Château-Thierry
- 29th Infantry Division
  - "Blue and Gray" – In 1919, when shoulder sleeve insignia were first authorized, the division consisted of two masses of men, one from the North (represented by blue) and the other from the South (represented by gray).
- 30th Infantry Division – "Old Hickory"; a nickname given by the Germans-"Roosevelt's SS" This is today's 30th Heavy Brigade Combat Team.
- 31st Infantry Division – "Dixie";
- 32nd Infantry Division
  - "Red Arrow"; "shot through a line denoting that it pierced every battle line it ever faced"; This is today's 32nd Infantry Brigade Combat Team.
  - "Les Terribles" – ("The Terrible Ones" intended as a compliment, given by French General Charles Mangin after their decisive action against the Germans at the WW1 Second Battle of the Marne
- 33rd Infantry Division
  - "Illinois";
  - "Prairie"; sometimes official nickname
  - "Golden Cross" – take from the design of the insignia, used as the title of the World War II history. This is today's 33rd Infantry Brigade Combat Team.
- 34th Infantry Division
  - "Red Bull" – The badge is a red bull's skull on a black background.
  - "Sandstorm" – the division was formed at Camp Cody, in a desertlike area of New Mexico
  - "Desert Bull" – sometimes used during modern deployments
- 35th Infantry Division
  - "Santa Fe" – The badge is a blue background with a white "Santa Fe cross", a device used to mark the old Santa Fe Trail, an area where the division trained
- 36th Infantry Division
  - "Arrowhead" – Official depicting insignia.
  - "Texas" – The division is based in Texas.
  - "Lone Star" – Texas is the "Lone Star State".
  - "T-Patch"
- 37th Infantry Division
  - "Buckeye"; This is today's 37th Infantry Brigade Combat Team.
- 38th Infantry Division
  - "Cyclone" – official. Named after a tornado hit the camp where the division was training prior to deployment during World War I.
  - "The Avengers of Bataan" This is today's 38th Sustainment Brigade.
- 40th Infantry Division
  - "Sunshine" – the badge is a gold sunburst on a blue background.
  - "Ball of Fire" – Nickname adopted during its deployment to Korea.
  - "Flaming Assholes" – The unofficial nickname came from the Korean War era when the unit was training in Japan. It was a combined result of disparaging remarks made by Army regulars about the National Guard division and the appearance of the unit shoulder sleeve insignia. The California Guardsmen took to their new nickname with a soldier's sense of humor, and turned it into a rallying symbol (sometimes used for the 9th Infantry Division, due to the appearance of that division's shoulder sleeve insignia).
- 41st Infantry Division
  - "Jungleers" – due to combat in the Pacific during WW II
  - "Sunset" – Unit patch has a half sun represents the setting sun on the Pacific. Often humorously referred to as the "Days Inn Patch" or "Thirteen Lieutenants Pointing North", this is today's 41st Infantry Brigade Combat Team.
- 42nd Infantry Division – "Rainbow"
- 43rd Infantry Division
  - "Red Wing"
  - "Winged Victory"
  - Named for World War II commander Leonard F. "Red" Wing
- 45th Infantry Division – "Thunderbird" – official nickname; This is today's 45th Infantry Brigade Combat Team.
- 46th Infantry Division (United States)-"Ironfist"
- 49th Infantry Division (United States)-"49'ers", "Argonauts"
- 47th Infantry Division – "Viking" – a unit of the Minnesota Army National Guard.
- 51st Infantry Division (United States)-"Rattlesnake"
- 63rd Infantry Division – "Blood and fire"; This is today's 63rd Regional Support Command.
- 65th Infantry Division – "Battle Axe";
- 66th Infantry Division – "Black Panther";
- 69th Infantry Division
  - "Fightin' 69th" – official nickname; earned after breaking through the Siegfried Line in 1945.
  - "Three B's" – nickname adopted during training. Humorous reference to the division's dislike of frequent bivouacking ordered by their original Commander, Charles L. Bolte.
- 70th Infantry Division – "Trailblazer";
- 71st Infantry Division – "Red Circle";
- 76th Infantry Division – "Onaway";
- 77th Infantry Division – "Metropolitan" or "Liberty"; This is today's 77th Sustainment Brigade.
- 78th Infantry Division – "Lightning";
- 79th Infantry Division – "Cross of Lorraine";
- 80th Infantry Division – "Blue Ridge"; This is today's 80th Training Command.
- 81st Infantry Division – "Wildcat"; This is today's 81st Regional Support Command.
- 83rd Infantry Division
  - "Ohio" –
  - "Ragtag Circus" – Ostensibly because of the vehicles the division commandeered from French and German sources, including a concrete mixer and fire truck, to transport troops into Germany during World War II.
- 84th Infantry Division – "Railsplitters"; This is today's 84th Training Command.
- 85th Infantry Division – "Custer"; This is today's 85th Support Command.
- 86th Infantry Division – "Blackhawk";
- 87th Infantry Division – "Golden Acorn"; This is today's 87th Support Command.
- 88th Infantry Division
  - "Blue Devils";
  - "Cloverleaf";
  - "The Puckering Butthole" – Due to the shape of the patch, a pair of crossed numeral 8's;
  - "8 Across and 8 Up!" – A play on military slang, insinuating that the quality of the division is low; This is today's 88th Regional Support Command.
- 89th Infantry Division
  - "Rolling 'W'"
  - "Middle West";
- 90th Infantry Division – The T & O Division– Due to the members of the WWI division being from the Texas-Oklahoma area, close to Mexico, "Tough 'Ombres" taken from the T O of the division shoulder patch, Ombres being a contraction for the Spanish Hombres, "Men, Tough Men."
- 91st Infantry Division – "Powder River";
- 92nd Infantry Division
  - "Buffalo" – a racially segregated African-American formation, named for the famed Buffalo Soldiers of the late 1800s.
- 93rd Infantry Division
  - "Red Hand"; "Adrians"; "Blue Helmets"
- 94th Infantry Division
  - "Neuf Cats" – a play on the division's ordinal numbers ("94") rendered into French ("neuf-quatre")
- 95th Infantry Division
  - "Iron Men of Metz" -from the siege of the town of Metz in eastern France during World War II.
  - "Victory"
  - "OK";
- 96th Infantry Division – "Deadeye";
- 97th Infantry Division – "Trident";
- 98th Infantry Division – "Iroquois";
- 99th Infantry Division – "Checkerboard"; “Battle Babies” This is today's 99th Regional Support Command.
- 100th Infantry Division – "Century";
- 102nd Infantry Division – "Ozark";
- 103rd Infantry Division – "Cactus";
- 104th Infantry Division – "Timberwolf";
- 106th Infantry Division – "Golden Lion"

== See also ==
- List of nicknames of British Army regiments
- List of warships by nickname
- Lists of nicknames – nickname list articles on Wikipedia
- Regimental nicknames of the Canadian Forces

== Sources ==
- The Army Almanac: A Book of Facts Concerning the Army of the United States. U.S. Government Printing Office. 1950.
- The Institute of Heraldry, Office of the Administrative Assistant to the Secretary of the Army
