= Chat Noir (disambiguation) =

Chat Noir (French, 'Black Cat') is a cabaret and revue theatre in Oslo, Norway.

Chat Noir may also refer to:

- Le Chat Noir, a 19th-century cabaret in Paris, France, or its weekly magazine
- Cat Noir (French: Chat Noir), superhero alias of fictional character Adrien Agreste

== See also ==
- Black cat (disambiguation)
- El Gato Negro (disambiguation)
- Henri, le Chat Noir, a web series by William Braden
- Le pas du chat noir, a 2001 album by Anouar Brahem
