= Tankie (disambiguation) =

Tankie is a pejorative reference to hard-line, pro-Soviet members of the Communist Party of Great Britain, and in some cases more broadly to supporters of authoritarian socialism.

Tankie or Tankies may also refer to:

- The Tankies, the nickname of the Royal Tank Regiment
- Tankies, the third series of Battlefields (comics)
- Tank driver, a driver of a tank
- A truck driver slang for tanker drivers, who haul liquids or bulk materials in tanks
- Fans of the World of Tanks game
- Fans of the Thomas the Tank Engine & Friends TV series and media franchise.
