= Black cab (disambiguation) =

Black cab most commonly refers to a car for hire associated with Britain, particularly London.

Black Cab or Black Taxi may also refer to:

- Black Cab (band), Melbourne-based drone and electronica group
- Black Cab (film), a 2024 horror film
- Black Taxi (band), American rock band

== See also ==
- Black cat (disambiguation)
