= Los Gatos (disambiguation) =

Los Gatos usually refers to Los Gatos, California, an incorporated town in Santa Clara County, California, United States.

Los Gatos may also refer to:

- Los Gatos (band), a 1960s Argentine rock band
- Los Gatos Creek (Fresno County, California)
- Los Gatos Creek (Santa Clara County, California)
  - Los Gatos Creek Park
  - Los Gatos Creek Trail

== See also ==
- Gato (disambiguation)
- The Cats (disambiguation), English translation
- Deportee (Plane Wreck at Los Gatos), song by Woody Guthrie
