= Special designation =

Approved nickname in US military

A special designation in the United States Army is a "nickname granted to a military organization" which has been authorized by the Center of Military History and recognized through a certificate signed by the Chief of Military History. Once approved, these designations may only be used by the officially recognized unit, or its recognized successor unit.

== Format ==
Special designations appear on the list in capital letters. Unofficial designations are not included. For example, the 1st Cavalry Regiment often uses Black Hawk, but officially adopted 1st REGIMENT OF DRAGOONS. The 4th Armored Division is sometimes called the "Breakthrough Division", but the division never officially pursued the designation, preferring to be "known by its deeds alone."

== Requesting a special designation ==
In most cases, only units authorized an organizational color, distinguishing flag, or guidon (excluding organic elements of color-bearing organizations) are entitled to special designations. Units wishing official recognition of special designations must request this designation from the United States Army Center of Military History. Special designations appear on any new Lineage and Honors Certificates issued to a unit.

== Designation vs. motto ==
There is often confusion between a motto and a special designation, but the former is a heraldic item controlled by the United States Army Institute of Heraldry, while the latter is usually a unit "nickname". For example, the 3rd Infantry's special designation as "THE OLD GUARD", stems from General Winfield Scott's description of the unit as The Old Guard of the army. The regiment's motto is NOLI ME TANGERE ("Do Not Touch Me"). The intent of the special designation program was not to duplicate an existing motto, but to provide units with another opportunity to express a direct association "with some person, place, thing, event, or function having particular significance to the unit [see Chapter 6, AR 870-5]." In short, it is a way in which unit personnel and others can refer to the unit.

== See also ==
- Nicknames of United States Army divisions
