= Regimental nicknames of the Canadian Forces =

Many regiments have over the years earned nicknames; some laudatory, some derogatory, but all colourful. Sometimes, the nicknames themselves have overshadowed the actual regimental title, e.g. the "Van Doos" for the Royal 22^{e} Régiment. In some cases the nickname actually replaced it: in 1881, the 42nd (Royal Highland) Regiment of Foot became officially known by its nickname, The Black Watch.

What follows is a list of nicknames of Canadian regiments, arranged alphabetically by regimental title. A brief explanation of the origin of the nickname, where known, is included.

== Regimental nicknames ==
=== # ===
Regiment	Nickname(s)
1st Hussars	1st Hosers
5th (British Columbia) Field Artillery Regiment, RCA	Five Tribe
7th Toronto Regiment	7 Guns; 7 Tor; The Black Hand
8th Canadian Hussars	Crazy 8s: after the card game.; The Hussies: a general military slang for Hussar Regiments; Eight C.H.; Channel 8
12^{e} Régiment blindé du Canada	12th Rubber Boot Company
48th Highlanders of Canada	The Glamour Boys; The Dirty Four Dozen

=== A-G ===
Regiment	Nickname(s)
The Algonquin Regiment (Northern Pioneers)	The Algoons (from World War II); The Gonks
The Argyll and Sutherland Highlanders of Canada (Princess Louise's)	Ash Cans
The British Columbia Regiment (Duke of Connaught's Own)	Big Chinese Restaurant; Billion Chinese Regiment: Derogatory. In reference to the large Asian population to inhabit Vancouver.; BCR's; The Dukes
The Brockville Rifles	The Brocks; The Broken Rifles
The Calgary Highlanders (10th Canadians)	Calgary Highgranders; The Cal Highs
The Canadian Grenadier Guards	The Guards; Canadian Girl Guides; Can’t Get Girls; Can't Goddam Graduate
The Essex and Kent Scottish	Eeks and Squeaks
The Fort Garry Horse	The Garry’s
Governor General's Foot Guards	GooGooFooGoos / Gugga Fuggas; Gustav Gone For Good
The Governor General's Horse Guards	Gugga Huggas
The Grey and Simcoe Foresters	Farmer Johns; The Gay and Simple Farmers

=== H-Q ===
Regiment	Nickname(s)
The Hastings and Prince Edward Regiment	Plough Jockeys: from World War II, bestowed because of the regiment's rural roots; Hasty P's: a play on their name and the short 'bathroom breaks' during wartime; Hasty Pasties: another play on their name.; Hasty Preedies
The King’s Own Calgary Regiment	Kay Ohs
The Lake Superior Scottish Regiment	The Lake Sups / The Lake Soups
The Lincoln and Welland Regiment	The Lincs; The Lincoln Welders; The Lincs and Winks
Lord Strathcona's Horse (Royal Canadians)	Lady Strathcona’s Riding Club; Strathcona's; Strats; Straths (WWII era)
The Lorne Scots Regiment	The Forlorn Scots; Horny Lornies: Derogatory. this likely originated from an urban legend regarding their yellow hackles, thought to be a battle disgrace (I can't find any record of such a disgrace).
The Loyal Edmonton Regiment	The Loyal Eds; The Loyal Eddies; The Eddies
Ontario Regiment	On Tars
Princess Patricia's Canadian Light Infantry	Ping Pong Champions of Long Island; The Patricias; The Princess Pats; The Pats; Dirty Cowboy: likely referring to the region their primary HQ resides in.; The Picklies. Derogatory, in reference to the unit acronym "PPCLI" being pronounced as one word.; The Vicious Patricias.; The PPCNR, a play on words from the initials of the regiment and one of the railroads to their western HQ
The Queen's Own Rifles of Canada	The Queen’s Own Rentals; Quickest out of Ridgeway: Derogatory: referring to the Battle of Ridgeway.

=== R-Z ===
Regiment	Nickname(s)
Royal 22nd Regiment	The Vandoos, a play on the English of “vingt deux” which is French for 22; Les Vingt-Deux
The Royal Canadian Dragoons	The RCD’s; Dragoon; The Goons
The Royal Canadian Regiment	The RCR: the official short title of the regiment; The Royals; The Junior Royals; Rocking Chair Rangers; Shino Boys: a First World War nickname given to The RCR by soldiers of other units, noting the regiment's high standards of dress and deportment; Run Chicken Run: Derogatory, a play on words deriving from the regiment's acronym and the purported illegal activity of a soldier
The Royal Hamilton Light Infantry (Wentworth Regiment)	The Riley’s
Royal Newfoundland Regiment	The Blue Puttees
The Royal Regiment of Canada	The Royals
Royal Regina Rifles	The Regina’s; The John's: from the Second World War most members were from Saskatchewan farming backgrounds ie "Farm John"
Royal Westminster Regiment	The Westies
Royal Winnipeg Rifles	The Little Black Devils
The Seaforth Highlanders of Canada	The Seaforth’s; The Bullwinkles
South Alberta Light Horse	The Sally Horse; Sally Ho; Sally H.
Stormont, Dundas and Glengarry Highlanders	Then Glens; Sand, Dust & Gravel
The Toronto Scottish Regiment (Queen Elizabeth The Queen Mother's Own)	The Tor Scots; The Trot Scots
The Sherbrooke Hussars	Sher H; The Sherbie Herbies
Les Fusiliers de Sherbrooke	Fuzz de Sher; The Fuzzy Wuzzies
West Nova Scotia Regiment	The West Novas

== See also ==
- List of nicknames of British Army regiments
- List of warships by nickname
- Lists of nicknames – nickname list articles on Wikipedia
- Nicknames of U.S. Army divisions
