= Guato =

Guató may refer to:

- the Guató people, an ethnic group of Brazil and Bolivia
- the Guató language, a language of Brazil and Bolivia

== See also ==
- Gwato, a town in Nigeria
- Gato (disambiguation)
