= Onmyo-Za =

Japanese heavy metal band

- Origin: Osaka, Japan
- Genres: Heavy metal; power metal; folk metal; symphonic metal
- Years active: 1999–present
- Labels: King (Japan); Gan-Shin (Europe)
- Members: Matatabi; Kuroneko; Maneki; Karukan
- Past members: Tora
- Website: onmyo-za.net

Onmyo-Za (Japanese: 陰陽座, Hepburn: Onmyō-za; literally "gathering of yin and yang") is a Japanese heavy metal band from Osaka, who released their first album in 1999.

== History ==
They play quite orthodox heavy metal music, mixed with elements from Japanese folk and pop music, and play both fast, hard songs and slow ballads. Since their debut in 1999, they have appeared in traditional clothing characteristic of Japan's Heian period.

Their name refers to Onmyōdō and the gathering of yin and yang (Inyo in Japanese, formerly Onmyō), and the theme of opposites and cosmic dual forces are prevalent in their lyrics. This contrast is also represented by the female and male vocals and two guitarists.

== Band members ==
- Matatabi – bass guitar, vocals, leader
- Kuroneko – vocals
- Maneki – guitar, backing vocals
- Karukan – guitar

Support members

- Dobashi Makoto – drums, percussion
- Abe Masahiro – keyboards

Former members

- Atsushi "Tora" Kawatsuka – drums, percussion (1999–2009)

== Stage names ==
Each of the band member's stage names feature a double entendre with a sense of humor and make references to cats.

- Matatabi (瞬火) means "flash fire", but it can also be read as silver vine (loved by cats, similar to catnip).
- Kuroneko (黒猫) literally means "black cat", just symbolizing her personality.
- Maneki (招鬼) practically means "summoning oni", but see also maneki neko.
- Karukan (狩姦) is unclear. Karu (狩) independently means "attacking"/"hunting" and Kan (姦) is "evil". The kanji 姦 and 奸, (the latter now meaning "wickedness") were the same in old times but have been changed. But it is also a brand of cat food.
- Tora (斗羅) is pronounced like the word "tiger", but its reading is the same as tabby. It also refers to him being a Hanshin Tigers fan.

== Influences ==
Matatabi was influenced by heavy metal bands such as Judas Priest, Annihilator, Destruction, and Rush. Osamu Tezuka and Futaro Yamada had a significant influence on him. Matatabi also hailed Ningen Isu as the precedent playing heavy metal and singing in Japanese. Kuroneko said she respects Ronnie James Dio as her eternal goal. In addition to that, her inspirations included Kenji Miyazawa and Zdzisław Beksiński. Karukan cites Jason Becker, Maneki and Paul Gilbert as his main influences. He practiced songs by "Shrapnel" Artists back in the day such as Jason Becker, Richie Kotzen, Greg Howe and so on, and covered Megadeth's songs along with Maneki. Maneki listed Gary Moore's "Blues Alive" as his favorite album.

== Themes and inspiration ==
Their songs mainly deal with Japanese folklore, such as the oni, yōkai, and the dragons. However, some songs have more concrete themes and inspirations. For example, Onmyo-Za have composed twelve songs related to "Ninpocho", or "ninja scrolls". These songs are a tribute to author Futaro Yamada and his ōchō series. The band's hit song, "Koga Ninpocho", was written for the Studio Gonzo TV animated series Basilisk, which was based on Yamada's novel, The Kouga Ninja Scrolls.

There are also some other songs inspired by Osamu Tezuka and Natsuhiko Kyogoku, and the Kumikyoku Yoshitsune trilogy is based on the legend of Japanese ancient tragic hero Minamoto no Yoshitsune. "Soōkoku/Dōkoku" was written for the Nintendo DS game The Inugami Clan which was based on Seishi Yokomizo's novel The Inugami Clan. "Aoki Dokugan" was written for the pachinko machine "CR Sengoku-ranbu Aoki Dokugan" which is based on the story of Date Masamune, a famous daimyō.

== Discography ==
=== Studio albums ===
Title	Release date	Peak Japanese chart position
Kikoku-Tenshō (鬼哭転生; Wailing Reincarnation)	December 5, 1999	did not chart
Hyakki-Ryōran (百鬼繚乱; Welter of Hundred Demons)	December 24, 2000	did not chart
Kojin-Rasetsu (煌神羅刹; Coruscating God Raksasa)	January 10, 2002	49
Fūin-Kairan (封印廻濫; Circulating Seal)	July 24, 2002	63
Hōyoku-Rindō (鳳翼麟瞳; Phoenix Wing, Unicorn's Eye)	January 22, 2003	23
Mugen-Hōyō (夢幻泡影; Illusion of Vapor and Shadow)	March 3, 2004	27
Garyo-Tensei (臥龍點睛; Finishing Touch)	June 22, 2005	20
Maō-Taiten (魔王戴天; Evil Lord Takes Heaven)	July 25, 2007	13
Chimimōryō (魑魅魍魎; Evil River and Mountain Spirits)	September 10, 2008	9
Kongōkyūbi (金剛九尾; Sturdy Dazzling Ninetails)	September 9, 2009	13
Kishi Bojin (鬼子母神; Mother of Devils)	December 21, 2011	13
Fūjin Kaikō (風神界逅; Fūjin Against the Realms)	September 24, 2014	10
Raijin Sōsei (雷神創世; Genesis of Raijin)	September 24, 2014	11
Karyō Binga (迦陵頻伽; "Kalavinka")	November 30, 2016	7
Hadō Myōō (覇道明王; High-handed Wisdom King)	June 6, 2018	11
Ryūō-Dōji (龍凰童子; Legacy of the Dragon King)	January 18, 2023	6
Ginmio Gozen (吟澪御前)	August 6, 2025	11

=== Compilations ===
Title	Album type	Release date	Peak Japanese chart position
Sekinetsu-Enbu (赤熱演舞; Red Hot Dance)	Live album	June 25, 2003	68
In'yō-Shugyoku (陰陽珠玉; Jewel of Yin and Yang)	"Best of" compilation album	February 8, 2006	14
Onmyō-Live (陰陽雷舞; Onmyou Thunder Live)	Live album	June 7, 2006	35
Ryūō-Shugyoku (龍凰珠玉; Jewel of Dragon and Phoenix)	"Best of" compilation album	December 4, 2013	18

=== Live Albums ===
Title	Release date	Peak Japanese chart position
Ginreisaibu	March 18, 2026	did not chart

=== Singles ===
Title	Release date	Peak Japanese chart position
"Ōka no Kotowari" (桜花ノ理; Logic of Cherry Blossoms)	August 19, 2000	did not chart
"Tsuki ni Murakumo Hana ni Kaze" (月に叢雲花に風; Moon in the Clouds, Flower in the Wind)	December 16, 2001	did not chart
"Yōka Ninpocho" (妖花忍法帖; Ninja Magic Story of Voluptuous Flower)	December 25, 2002	57
"Hōyoku-Tenshō" (鳳翼天翔; Soaring Phoenix Wing)	June 4, 2003	66
"Mezame" (醒; Awakening)	October 1, 2003	30
"Nemuri" (睡; Sleep)	January 7, 2004	40
"Kumikyoku "Yoshitsune" – Akki Hogan" (組曲『義経』～悪忌判官; "Yoshitsune" Musical Suite – The Abhorrer of Evil )	September 23, 2004	30
"Kumikyoku "Yoshitsune" – Muma Enjō" (組曲『義経』～夢魔炎上; Blazing Nightmare )	October 27, 2004	32
"Kumikyoku "Yoshitsune" – Raise Kaikō" (組曲『義経』～来世邂逅; Reunite in Afterworld )	November 26, 2004	33
"Kōga Ninpocho" (甲賀忍法帖: Ninja Magic Story of the Kouga): Basilisk TV animation theme song	April 27, 2005	31
"Kokui no Tennyo" (黒衣の天女; Black-Robed Celestial Maiden)	June 27, 2007	14
"Kureha" (紅葉; Kureha): "Kureha" is a name of legendary female Oni.	August 6, 2008	15
"Sōkoku/Dōkoku" (相剋/慟哭; Rivalry/Lament): The Inugami Clan Nintendo DS game soft theme songs	January 21, 2009	13
"Aoki Dokugan" (蒼き独眼; The Blue One-eyed ): A song tributes to Date Masamune	August 26, 2009	17
"Konpeki no Sōjin" (紺碧の双刃; Azure twin blades ): Announced as a sequel to Aoki Dokugan	February 9, 2011	23
"Seiten no Mikazuki" (青天の三日月; Crescent moon in the blue sky): Announced as a sequel to Konpeki no Sōjin	March 19, 2014	19
"Ōka Ninpōchō" (桜花忍法帖; Ninja Scroll of Cherry Blossoms): Theme song for Basilisk: The Ōka Ninja Scrolls, sequel to the 2005 animation	January 10, 2018	15

=== Live performances ===
Title	Media type	Release date	Peak Japanese chart position
Hyakki-Korinden (百鬼降臨伝; The Legend of Descent of Hundred Demons)	VHS; DVD	January 10, 2002; February 14, 2004	did not chart
Hakkō-Ranbu (白光乱舞; White Shining Boisterous Dance)	DVD	June 25, 2003	40
Wagashikabane wo Koeteyuke (我屍越行; Go Beyond the Corpse of Mine)	DVD	March 2, 2005	28
Yūgen-Reibu (幽玄霊舞; The Live for Profoundness and Sprits)	DVD	August 22, 2005	Fanclub only
Shugyoku-Enbu (珠玉宴舞; The Jewel of Feast and Dance)	DVD	June 21, 2006	40
Tenkafubu (天下布舞; Conquer the World with Pageant)	DVD	January 23, 2008	44
Ryuō Rinbu (龍凰輪舞; Rondo of Dragon and Phoenix)	DVD	April 21, 2010	24
Shikigami Raibu (式神雷舞; Shikigami Thunder Live)	DVD	July 1, 2010	Fanclub only
Zekkai Enbu (絶界演舞; Hidden World Live)	DVD	September 5, 2012	6
Shikigami Ōbu (式神謳舞; Shikigami Celebration Live)	DVD	December 13, 2013	Fanclub only
Fujin Raibu (風神雷舞; Wind God Live)	DVD/Blu-ray	September 9, 2015	15
Raijin Raibu (雷神雷舞; Thunder God Live)	DVD/Blu-ray	September 9, 2015	16
Zetten Ranbu (絶巓鸞舞; Absolute Dance)	DVD/Blu-ray	June 14, 2017	6
Hadō Seibu (覇道征舞)	DVD/Blu-ray	March 13, 2019	10
