= The Black Cat (Canadian magazine) =

Fantasy magazine published in 1970

- Categories: Literature
- Frequency: Single issue
- Publisher: Memory Lane Publications
- Founder: George Henderson
- First issue: 1970
- Country: Canada
- Language: English

The Black Cat was a Canadian magazine published by George Henderson's Memory Lane Publications, Toronto. Only a single issue was ever published, dated Winter 1970/1971. The magazine was named after an older US magazine, The Black Cat, but was not a continuation of it.

The Black Cat contained reprinted fantasy and science fiction stories, including Edgar Allan Poe's "The Cask of Amontillado" and an extract from Mary Shelley's Frankenstein.

The magazine ceased publication after a single issue because Henderson's distributor went bankrupt after taking delivery of the first issue. It was 64 pages long, and priced at 50 cents.

== Sources ==
- Ashley, Mike (1985). "The Black Cat (1970)". In Tymn, Marshall B.; Ashley, Mike (eds.). Science Fiction, Fantasy and Weird Fiction Magazines. Westport, Connecticut: Greenwood Press. pp. 149–150. ISBN 0-3132-1221-X.
