= Black cat analogy =

Analogy about science and religion

The black cat analogy is an analogy accounting for the differences between science and religion, or in some versions also between other disciplines such as philosophy and metaphysics.

== Description ==
The analogy can be described like this:

- Philosophy is like being in a dark room and looking for a black cat.
- Metaphysics is like being in a dark room and looking for a black cat that isn't there.
- Theology is like being in a dark room and looking for a black cat that isn't there, and shouting "I found it!"
- Science is like being in a dark room looking for a black cat while using a flashlight.
- Social Science is like being in a dark room suspecting from the beginning that there is a black cat somewhere, and emerging from the room with scratches on the forearm as vindication.

It can also be applied to other bodies of knowledge or learning, for example by Ernest Gellner to Marxism.

== Explanation ==
Vincent Barry explains the difference between philosophy and theology as lying in the fact that philosophy is scientific and open-minded, concerned with proof, while theologians "have found their final truth" before they begin the search.

== Origin ==
Many variations on the analogy exist, and they have been variously attributed to several famous figures at different times (e.g. misquotations of Charles Darwin), but the quotation has been around since at least the 1890s. Its absolute origin is unknown.

Wendy Doniger relates it to a French and English proverb: "In the dark, all cats are grey." Hegel criticised naive ideas of the Absolute, which he ridiculed as "like a night, as people say, in which all cows are black." Dashiell Hammett in The Dain Curse (1929) referred to a "blind man in a dark room hunting for a black hat that wasn't there". Ernest Gellner referred to an East European joke about science, philosophy, and Marxism as looking for a cat in a dark room with various consequences: with science the cat is present, with philosophy absent, and with Marxism absent but found.

== See also ==
- Black cat
- Relationship between religion and science
