= Military of Germany (disambiguation) =

The military of Germany refers to the Bundeswehr, the current armed forces of Germany (and West Germany prior to reunification) since 1955.

Military of Germany may also refer to:

- German Federal Army (1815-1866), armed forces of the German Confederation (lit. German Federal Army)
- Imperial German Army (1871–1919), armed forces of the German Empire (lit. Imperial Army)
- Reichswehr (1919–1935), armed forces of the Weimar Republic (lit. Reich Defence)
- Wehrmacht (1935–1945), armed forces of Nazi Germany (lit. Defence Force)
- National People's Army (1956–1990), armed forces of the former German Democratic Republic of eastern Germany, prior to the reunification (lit. National People's Army)
