= Gato (given name) =

Gato or El Gato is given name or nickname that may refer to

== People with the given name ==
- Gato Dumas (1938–2004), Argentine chef
- Gato Eveready (Víctor Manuel Soto Flores, born 1975), Mexican professional wrestler, known as "El Gato"

== People with the nickname ==
- Edgardo Obregón (born 1999), football prodigy from Mexico, nicknamed "Gato"
- Gastón Gaudio (born 1978), Argentinian tennis player, nicknamed "El Gato"
- Gato Barbieri (1932-2016), Argentinian jazz tenor saxophonist and composer
- Orlando Melendez (born 1979), Puerto Rico-born basketball player for the Harlem Globetrotters, nicknamed "El Gato"
- Pat Tanaka (born 1961), Hawaiian wrestler who has used the ring name "El Gato"
