= Gato (surname) =

Gato or Gatoh is a surname that may refer to:

- Enrique Gato (born 1977), Spanish filmmaker
- Idalmis Gato (born 1971), Cuban Olympic volleyball player
- Jun Gato (1959–2026), Filipino physician and politician
- Manuel Gato (born 1984), Spanish association football player
- Ramón Gato (born 1973), Cuban Olympic volleyball player
- Shoji Gatoh (born 1971), Japanese author
