= Kuroneko (singer) =

Kuroneko 黒猫
- Origin: Osaka Prefecture, Japan
- Genres: Rock, heavy metal
- Occupation: Vocalist
- Member of: Onmyo-Za

Kuroneko (黒猫), born in Osaka Prefecture, Japan, is the pseudonym of the lead singer of the Japanese heavy metal band, Onmyo-Za.

After being part of some local bands, she and Matatabi, the leader and primary songwriter, formed Onmyo-Za in Osaka in 1999. "Kuroneko" means black cat, a name she used before Onmyo-Za. The other members also use cat-related stage names.
