= Il Gato =

Band from San Francisco, California

Il Gato is an indie/baroque/folk band from San Francisco, California. The core ensemble of musicians consists of guitarist/vocalist Daimian Holiday Scott, bassist/vocalist Andrew Thomas and drummer/vocalist Johnny Major.

Their debut studio album, All these Slippery Things (July, 2010), and follow-up EP from the same sessions, All those Slippery Things (July, 2011) were recorded and mixed at Tiny Telephone Studios in San Francisco, engineered by Ian Pelicci (Deerhoof, Rogue Wave, Hauschka, etc.) and mastered by Roger Seibel at SAE Mastering (Broken Social Scene, Death Cab for Cutie, Bon Iver, The Dodos, Cat Power, The Decemberists, Modest Mouse, etc.). Overdubs were recorded in the apartment of bassist, Andrew Thomas. Il Gato’s first release, conversationmusic (2007), was a solo singer/songwriter bedroom recording by lead singer, Daimian Holiday Scott.

Il Gato has been on the bill with American Music Club, Sam Amidon, Castanets, and Tom Brosseau. Venues played include The Great American Music Hall (SF), Rickshaw Stop (SF), and Bootleg Theater (LA).

A number of Il Gato songs appear in the critically acclaimed documentary film, Crime after Crime, which premiered at the 2011 Sundance Film Festival.
