= List of nicknames of British Army regiments =

This is a list of nicknames of regiments of the British Army. Many nicknames were used by successor regiments (following renaming or amalgamation).

== 0 ==
- The 0.7 Hussars – 14th/20th King's Hussars (humorous simplification of regimental title)

== 1 ==
- 1st Invalids – 41st (Welsh) Regiment of Foot later The Welsh Regiment (first raised as the Regiment of Invalids, in 1688)

== A ==
- Agile and Bolton Wanderers – Argyll and Sutherland Highlanders (humorous allusion to Bolton Wanderers F.C.)
- The Aiglers – 87th Foot (captured a French Imperial Eagle (aigle) at the Battle of Barrosa)
- The Albert Lesters – Prince Albert's Own Leicestershire Yeomanry, also known as "God's Own" in the 3rd Cavalry Division during the Great War (reference to the lack of KIA until 13 May 1915 – having landed in France since early November 1914).
- Ally Sloper's Cavalry – Army Service Corps (humorous back-acronym; Ally Sloper was a popular pre-WWI cartoon character drawn by W.F. Thomas in a weekly comic strip; in contemporary slang an 'Alley Sloper' was a rent-dodger, who 'sloped off down the alley' when the rent-collector called)
- Andy Capp's Commandos – Army Catering Corps, named after the famous newspaper cartoon character Andy Capp
- The Angle-irons – Royal Anglian Regiment (humorous malapropism)
- The Armoured Chavalry – Royal Tank Regiment
- The Armoured Farmers – 3rd Royal Tank Regiment (raised in the West Country)
- The Assaye Regiment – 74th (Highland) Regiment of Foot (awarded a special Regimental Colour for service at the Battle of Assaye)

== B ==
- The Back Numbers (also The Back Badgers) – Gloucestershire Regiment (allowed to wear a regimental badge on the back of the hat, after the rear rank faced about to drive off French cavalry at the Battle of Alexandria (1801))
- The Back Flash – Royal Welch Fusiliers (the last regiment to give up the queue or pigtail, retained the ribbons on the back of the collar)
- Bakers Light Bobs – 10th Royal Hussars (Prince of Wales's Own)
- The Balsall Heath Artillery – 3rd South Midland Brigade, Royal Field Artillery (from their headquarters at Stoney Lane, Balsall Heath)
- The Bangalore Gallopers – 13th Hussars
- The Bangers – 1st Life Guards
- Barrell's Blues – 4th Foot
- The Bays – 2nd Dragoon Guards (Queen's Bays)
- The Beavers – 100th (Prince of Wales's Royal Canadian) Regiment of Foot later 1st Battalion Leinster Regiment (refers to the regiment's origin in Canada, and its first regimental badge)
- The Belfast Regiment – 35th Foot
- The Bendovers – 96th Regiment of Foot later 2nd Battalion Manchester Regiment
- The Bengal Tigers

– Leicestershire Regiment (In 1825 the regiment was granted the badge of a "royal tiger" to recall their long service in India)
– 24th Foot

- The Bermuda Exiles – Grenadier Guards
- The Bill Browns – Grenadier Guards
- Bingham's Dandies – 17th Lancers (The commanding officer, Lord Bingham (later Earl of Lucan) spent a fortune on fine uniforms and horses for the regiment)
- The Biscuit Boys – 49th (Princess Charlotte of Wales's) (Hertfordshire) Regiment of Foot later 1st Battalion Royal Berkshire Regiment
- The Bird Catchers

– 1st (Royal) Dragoons and Royal Scots Greys (both regiments captured French Imperial Eagle standards at the Battle of Waterloo)
– 87th Foot (captured a French Imperial Eagle at the Battle of Barrosa)

- The Black Cuffs – Northamptonshire Regiment
- The Black Dragoons – 6th (Inniskilling) Dragoons
- The Black Hand Gang – 12th (Service) Battalion, East Surrey Regiment (Bermondsey), some of whom had been recruited from a notorious Bermondsey street gang of that name
- The Black Horse – 7th (The Princess Royal's) Dragoon Guards
- The Black Knots – North Staffordshire Regiment (the regimental badge was a Stafford knot)
- The Black Mafia – Royal Green Jackets (from the dark uniforms of the original Rifle regiments and the number of former Greenjacket officers promoted to high rank)
- Blayney's Bloodhounds – 89th (The Princess Victoria's) Regiment of Foot (from their 'unerring certainty and untiring perseverance in hunting down the Irish rebels in 1798, when the corps was commanded by Lord Blayney')
- The Bleeders – Somerset Light Infantry
- The Blind Half Hundred – 50th (Queen's Own) Regiment of Foot later Royal West Kent Regiment (suffered badly from ophthalmia during the Egyptian Campaign of 1801.)
- The Bloodless Lambs – 16th Foot
- The Bloodsuckers – 63rd (West Suffolk) Regiment of Foot later 1st Battalion Manchester Regiment (Supposedly derived from a regimental emblem worn by officers, the Fleur de Lis, 'which resembled that insect' – (Most commonly said to be a mosquito, associated with the Regiment's frequent service in the Caribbean and America).)
- The Bloody Eleventh – 11th (The North Devonshire) Regiment of Foot, later The Devonshire Regiment (from the heavy casualties suffered at the Battle of Salamanca)
- The Blue Caps – The Royal Dublin Fusiliers (Originally the 1st Madras Fusiliers, part of the British East India Company's Madras Presidency Army, who wore light blue covers to their forage caps on campaign during the Indian Mutiny and were known as 'Neill's Blue Caps,' after their commanding officer).
- The Blues – Royal Horse Guards (only British heavy cavalry regiment to wear blue rather than red uniforms)
- The Blue Horse – 4th Dragoon Guards
- The Blue Mafia – Queen's Own Highlanders
- Bobs' Own – Irish Guards (refers to Field Marshal Lord Roberts, 'Bobs', the first Colonel of the regiment)
- The Bolt Heads - The Gloucester Regiment, for the unique front and back badge on their berets.
- The Bomb-proofs – 14th Foot
- The Botherers – King's Own Scottish Borderers (humorous malapropism)
- The Bounders – 19th Foot
- The Boxers' Battalion – 20th (Service) Battalion, Middlesex Regiment (Shoreditch)
- The Brass Heads – 109th Foot
- The Brave Boys of Berks – Berkshire Regiment
- The Brickdusts – 53rd (Shropshire) Regiment of Foot later 1st Battalion Shropshire Light Infantry
- The Brothers – King's Own Scottish Borderers
- Brown's Corps – 1st Lancashire Artillery Volunteers, raised by Sir William Brown, Baronet, and largely officered by his relatives
- The Brummagen Guards – 29th (Worcestershire) Regiment of Foot (Largely recruited from the Birmingham area)
- The Bubbly Jocks – Royal Scots Greys
- Buckmaster's Light Infantry – West India Regiments
- The Budgies – the Royal Regiment of Fusiliers (from the hackle worn in the beret)
- The Butchers – 37th Foot
- The Buttermilks – 4th Royal Irish Dragoon Guards

== C ==
- Calvert's Entire – West Yorkshire Regiment
- The Cameronians – 1st Battalion The Cameronians (Scottish Rifles)
- The Carbs – Carabiniers (6th Dragoon Guards)
- Lord Cardigan's Bloodhounds – 11th Hussars
- The Cast Iron Sixth – 6th Battalion, London Regiment (City of London Rifles)
- Castor Oil Dragoons – Royal Army Medical Corps
- The Cat and Cabbage – The Royal Hampshire Regiment (from the regimental badge, which was a royal lion atop a stylised Tudor Rose)
- The Cattle Reivers – Border Regiment
- The Cauliflowers 47th (Lancashire) Regiment of Foot later 1st Battalion The Loyal North Lancashire Regiment (from the regimental badge, which was a stylised Red Rose of Lancaster)
- The Celestials – 97th (The Earl of Ulster's) Regiment of Foot later 2nd Battalion Royal West Kent Regiment
- The Centipedes – 100th (Prince of Wales's Royal Canadian) Regiment of Foot later 1st Battalion Leinster Regiment
- The Chainy 10th – 10th Royal Hussars (Prince of Wales's Own)
- Chavasse's Light Horse – 56th Reconnaissance Regiment (from a commanding officer's surname)
- Cheeses – 1st Life Guards and 2nd Life Guards
- The Cheesemongers – Household Cavalry
- The Cherry Pickers – 11th Hussars (Prince Albert's Own) (from an incident during the Peninsular War, in which the 11th Light Dragoons (as the regiment was then named) were attacked while raiding an orchard at San Martin de Trebejo in Spain)
- The Cherubims – 11th Hussars (Prince Albert's Own) (originally the "Cherrybums", from the crimson overall trousers adopted when Prince Albert of Saxe-Coburg-Gotha became the Honorary Colonel in Chief)
- Cia ma Tha's – 79th Highlanders (Scottish Gaelic for 'What's Wrong?')
- The Cloudpunchers – Air Defence regiments of the Royal Artillery
- The Coal Heavers – Grenadier Guards
- The Cockney Jocks – London Scottish
- The Coldstreamers – Coldstream Guards
- The Colonials – 100th (Prince of Wales's Royal Canadian) Regiment of Foot later 1st Battalion Leinster Regiment
- The Comical Chemical Corporals – Special Brigade, Royal Engineers (responsible for poison gas and flame attacks; men with knowledge of chemistry were immediately promoted to corporal)
- The Commos – Royal Army Service Corps (possibly from their origins in the Commissariat and Transport Staff)
- The Crossbelts – 8th Hussars
- The Crusaders – 100th (Prince of Wales's Royal Canadian) Regiment of Foot later 1st Battalion Leinster Regiment
- The Corned Beef Highlanders – The Cameron Highlanders, used as a reference to the Regimental tartan

== D ==
- The Daily Advertisers – 5th Lancers
- The Dandies – 1st Battalion Grenadier Guards
- The Dandy Ninth – 9th (Highlanders) Battalion Royal Scots
- The Death or Glory Boys – 17th Lancers (Duke of Cambridge's Own) later 17th/21st Lancers, then Queen's Royal Lancers (from the regimental badge, which was a death's head (skull), with a scroll bearing the motto "or Glory")
- The Delhi Spearman – 9th Lancers
- The Desert Rats – 7th Armoured Division (United Kingdom) then 7th Armoured Brigade (United Kingdom), now 7th Infantry Brigade
- The Devil's Own – 88th Regiment of Foot (Connaught Rangers) later 1st Battalion The Connaught Rangers
- The Devil's Own – Inns of Court Regiment (so named by King George III )
- The Devils Royals – 50th (Queen's Own) Regiment of Foot later 1st Battalion Royal West Kent Regiment
- The Diehards – 57th (West Middlesex) Regiment of Foot later 1st Battalion Middlesex Regiment (from the Battle of Albuera during the Peninsular War, when Colonel William Inglis is said to have urged the decimated regiment to "die hard")
- The Dirty Eighth – 8th Hussars
- The Dirty Half Hundred – 50th (Queen's Own) Regiment of Foot later 1st Battalion Royal West Kent Regiment
- The Dirty Shirts – 101st Regiment of Foot (Royal Bengal Fusiliers) later 1st Battalion Royal Munster Fusiliers (During the Indian Mutiny the regiment wore shirts stained an early form of khaki as campaign dress)
- The Ditchers – 10th (Service) Battalion, Royal Fusiliers (Stockbrokers) (raised in 1914 by the City of London; the original recruits were sworn in at the Ditch (dry moat) of the Tower of London)
- The Doc's – Duke of Cornwall's Light Infantry – (from their initials DOCLI)
- The Dogs – 17th Lancers
- Dog Squadron – 1 Armoured Engineers Squadron
- The Donkey Whallopers – Cavalry
- The Don't-Dance Tenth – 10th Hussars
- The Double X – Lancashire Fusiliers (from the regimental badge which, as the 20th Regiment of Foot, carried "XX", twenty in Roman numerals)
- Douglas's Ecossais – Royal Scots (originally the Régiment de Douglas in French service)
- The Drogheda Light Horse – 18th Royal Hussars (Queen Mary's Own)
- The Drop-short Rifles – Royal Regiment of Artillery
- The Dubsters – a composite of 1st Royal Dublin Fusiliers and 1st Royal Munster Fusiliers (formed between 30 April and 19 May 1915 after both battalions suffered heavy casualties)
- The Duke's (or The Duke's Own) – 1st Royal Lancashire Militia (The Duke of Lancaster's Own) (especially after they were linked to the King's Own)
- The Duke of Boots – Duke of Wellington's Regiment
- The Duke's Canaries – Edinburgh (County and City) Militia (commanded by Henry Scott, 3rd Duke of Buccleuch, from their yellow facings)
- The Dumpies – 19th Royal Hussars (Queen Alexandra's Own), 20th Hussars and 21st Lancers (originally raised for the army of the British East India Company, from undersized riders who would not overload the lighter, locally procured horses.)

== E ==
- The Eagle-Takers – 87th Foot (captured a French Imperial Eagle at the Battle of Barrosa)
- The Earl of Mar's Grey Breeks – Royal Scots Fusiliers (from their first colonel, Charles Erskine, Earl of Mar, and the grey breeches of their uniform)
- The Edinburgh Regiment – 46th Foot
- The Elegant Extracts – 7th Regiment of Foot later Royal Fusiliers and 85th Regiment of Foot (Bucks Volunteers) later 2nd Battalion Shropshire Light Infantry (in 1811, many of the regiment's officers were court-martialled and replaced by officers drawn from other regiments.)
- Eliott's Light Horse – 15th The King's Hussars
- The Emperor's Chambermaids – 14th King's Hussars (from an incident during the Battle of Vitoria during the Peninsular War, when the regiment captured a silver chamberpot belonging to Joseph Bonaparte, brother of the Emperor Napoleon Bonaparte)
- England's Northern Cavalry – The Light Dragoons
- The English Jocks – 2nd Battalion, Gloucestershire Regiment (in 1914–16 they were the only English Battalion in 81st Brigade, which otherwise consisted of up to five Scottish battalions)
- The Evergreens – 13th Hussars
- The Ever-Sworded – 29th (Worcestershire) Regiment of Foot later Worcestershire Regiment
- The Excellers – 40th (2nd Somersetshire) Regiment of Foot later South Lancashire Regiment (from the regimental badge; 40 in Roman numerals is "XL")

== F ==
- The Faithful Durhams – Durham Light Infantry (from their motto, 'Faithful')
- Faugh-a-Ballagh Boys, or The Faughs – 87th (Royal Irish Fusiliers) Regiment of Foot later 1st Battalion Royal Irish Fusiliers (from their Gaelic war cry 'Faugh a Ballagh' ('Clear the Way') during the Peninsular War).
- The Featherbeds – 16th Foot
- The Fighting Fifth – 5th (Northumberland Fusiliers) Regiment of Foot later Royal Northumberland Fusiliers
- The Fighting Fifteenth – 15th The King's Hussars
- The Fighting Fortieth – 40th (2nd Somersetshire) Regiment of Foot later South Lancashire Regiment
- The Fighting Ninth – 9th Regiment of Foot later The Norfolk Regiment
- The First and the Last – 4th/7th Royal Dragoon Guards
- First of Track 1st Royal Tank Regiment (humorous from the infantry's history being named xth of Foot)
- Fitch's Grenadiers – The Royal Irish Rifles
- The Five-and-threepennies – 53rd Foot
- The Fifth Skins – 5th Inniskilling Dragoon Guards
- The Flamers – 2nd Battalion The Dorsetshire Regiment
- The Flying Bricklayers – Royal Engineers
- The Fogies – 41st Foot (originally formed from invalids and Chelsea Pensioners, see 1st Invalids)
- The Fore & Aft – Gloucestershire Regiment (wore a second badge on the back of their headdress: see Back Numbers)
- The Foreign Legion – Welsh Guards
- The Forty Twas – 42nd (Royal Highland) Regiment of Foot later Black Watch
- The Forty-Tens – 2nd Battalion Prince of Wales's Leinster Regiment (from an incident in India where the men were 'numbering', or calling out their position in the ranks: after they reached 'forty-nine' the next man called out 'forty-ten'.)
- The Four-Wheeled Hussars – Royal Horse Artillery
- The Fragile and Suffering Highlanders – 1st Battalion Argyle and Sutherland Highlanders, used by other regiments in the Highland Brigade circa 1960/70

== G ==
- The Gallant Half-Hundred – 50th Foot
- The Gallants – 9th Battalion East Surrey Regiment
- The Gallopers – 2nd Life Guards
- The Galloping Gunners – Royal Horse Artillery
- The Garvies – Connaught Rangers
- The Gay Gordons – Gordon Highlanders (from the name of a popular dance)
- The Gentleman Dragoons – 17th Lancers
- George's – 8th King's Royal Irish Hussars (gained Royal title in reign of King George III)
- The Geraniums – 13th Hussars
- The German Legion, or The German Mob – 109th Foot (possibly took recruits from the disbanded British German Legion)
- The Glasgow Greys – 70th (Surrey) Regiment of Foot later 2nd Battalion East Surrey Regiment
- The Glesca Keelies – 71st (Highland) Regiment of Foot later 1st Battalion Highland Light Infantry (Regiment was mostly recruited in Glasgow ("Glesca"), allegedly from local ruffians ("Keelies").
- The Globe Rangers – Royal Marines (from their badge)
- The Glorious Glosters – The Gloucestershire Regiment
- Lord Adam Gordon's Life Guards – 3rd Hussars
- Graham's Perthshire Grey-Breeks – 90th Regiment of Foot (Perthshire Volunteers) (raised by Thomas Graham, Lord Lynedoch)
- The Grannies – Grenadier Guards
- The Grasshoppers – 95th (Rifle) Regiment of Foot (reference to rifle green colour of uniforms)
- The Green Cats – 17th Foot (from their Royal Tiger badge)
- The Green Dragoons – 13th Hussars
- The Green Gunners – Princess Beatrice's (Isle of Wight) Heavy Regiment, Royal Artillery, whose officers continued to wear the Rifle green uniform of the Isle of Wight Rifles after they were converted from infantry to coast artillery
- The Green Horse – 5th (Princess Charlotte of Wales's) Dragoon Guards
- The Green Howards – 19th (1st North Riding of Yorkshire) Regiment of Foot later Green Howards (Alexandra, Princess of Wales's Own Yorkshire Regiment) (So named in 1744, to distinguish them from Howard's Buffs by facing colour of uniform; both regiments had colonels named Howard at the time)
- The Green Jackets – 60th (Royal American) Regiment later Kings Royal Rifle Corps and The Rifle Brigade (in the Napoleonic Wars, both were specialised corps of skirmishers, armed with rifles and wearing rifle green uniforms rather than the standard red coat)
- The Green Linnets – 39th (Dorsetshire) Regiment of Foot later The Dorsetshire Regiment
- The Green Tigers – see Green Cats
- The Greybreeks – see Earl of Mar's, and Graham's
- The Grey Dragoons – 2nd Dragoons (Royal Scots Greys)
- The Grey Lancers – 21st Lancers (Empress of India's) (from French-grey colour of regimental facings)
- The Grey Mafia – Queen Alexandra's Royal Army Nursing Corps
- The Guards of the Line – 29th Foot
- Guise's Geese – Royal Warwickshire Regiment
- The Gurkhas – Royal Gurkha Rifles

== H ==
- The Halls and Balls Light Infantry – 6th Battalion, London Regiment (City of London Rifles)
- The Hampshire Tigers – Royal Hampshire Regiment (from their Royal Tiger badge)
- The Hanoverian White Horse – Royal Fusiliers
- The Havercakes, or The Havercake Lads – 33rd Regiment of Foot later Duke of Wellington's Regiment (West Riding) (because their recruiting officers walked along with an oatcake on their sword-point)
- Havelock's Temperance Battalion – 48th Middlesex Rifle Volunteer Corps (recruited by the noted Temperance campaigner George Cruikshank)
- The Heavy Gunners – Royal Garrison Artillery
- Hell's Last Issue – the Highland Light Infantry (humorous back-acronym)
- The Heroes of Talavera – 47th Foot
- The Herts Guards (or Hertfordshire Guards) – Hertfordshire Regiment (1/1st Bn served in 4th (Guards) Brigade in 1914–15)
- The Hexham Butchers – North York Militia – (ordered to fire on anti-militia rioters who attacked them at Hexham in 1761)
- The Hindoostan Regiment – 76th Foot
- The Holy Boys – 9th Regiment of Foot later The Norfolk Regiment (from their Britannia badge, misidentified as the Virgin Mary)
- The Horse Doctors – Royal Army Veterinary Corps
- The Horse Marines – 17th Lancers (Duke of Cambridge's Own)
- The Housemaids' Pets – Grenadier Guards
- Howard's Garbage – Green Howards
- Howard's Greens – South Wales Borderers
- The Hull Commercials – 10th Battalion, East Yorkshire Regiment
- The Hull Tradesmen – 11th Battalion, East Yorkshire Regiment
- The Hull Sportsmen – 12th Battalion, East Yorkshire Regiment
- T'Others – 13th Battalion, East Yorkshire Regiment

== I ==
- The Illustrious Garrison – 13th (Somerset) Light Infantry (from their defence of Jellalabad in 1841–42)
- The Immortals – 76th Foot
- The Ink Slingers – Royal Army Pay Corps
- The Iron Chests – 66th Foot
- The Iron Regiment – The Royal Sussex Regiment
- The Irish Giants – The Royal Irish Rifles
- The Irish Lancers – 5th Royal Irish Lancers
- The Isle of Wight Gurkhas – Princess Beatrice's Isle of Wight rifles, 8th Battalion Hampshire Regiment (due to the reputed small stature of its members and similarities in drill and uniform to Gurkha regiments.)
- The Isle of Wight Rifles – 9 (Princess Beatrice's) Platoon, C (Duke of Connaught's) Company, 6th/7th Battalion Princess of Wales's Royal Regiment (disbanded 1998) (due to the platoon's continued lineage from Princess Beatrice's Isle of Wight rifles, 8th Hampshire Regiment and their location on the Isle of Wight.)

== J ==
- Jacks – Military Police during WWI
- The Jaegers – 60th (Royal American) Regiment later Kings Royal Rifle Corps (when first formed, included large numbers of German and German-speaking Swiss Jägers (light infantry))
- The Jellalabad Heroes – 13th (Somerset) Light Infantry (from their defence of Jellalabad in 1841–42)
- The Jocks – Scots Guards (In Scotland the common Christian name John is often changed to Jock)
- Joeys – Royal Marine Light Infantry
- Jollies – Royal Marine Light Infantry
- The Judaeans – 38th–42nd Battalions Royal Fusiliers (the battalions formed the Jewish Brigade)

== K ==
- The Kaiser's Own – 60th (Royal American) Regiment later Kings Royal Rifle Corps (see The Jaegers)
- Kamarha – 79th Highlanders
- The Kids, or Kiddies – Scots Guards name given to the Third Regiment of Foot Guards when reaching King William III's Guards camp in 1686
- The Kingos – King's Liverpool Regiment later King's Regiment
- The King's Men – 78th Highlanders later 2nd Battalion Seaforth Highlanders
- The King's Hanoverian White Horse – 8th Foot
- Kingsley's Stand – Lancashire Fusiliers
- Kirke's Lambs – The Queen's (Royal West Surrey Regiment) (from their Paschal Lamb badge; ironic allusion to their brutal conduct under Percy Kirke's command during the Monmouth Rebellion)
- Knapp's Nippers – 12th (Service) Battalion, East Surrey Regiment (Bermondsey), after their commanding officer
- The Kokky-Olly Birds – The King's Own Scottish Borderers
- The Kosbies or Kobs – King's Own Scottish Borderers (from their initials)
- The Koylis – The King's Own Yorkshire Light Infantry (from their initials)

== L ==
- The Lacedemonians – Duke of Cornwall's Light Infantry
- The Lambs – 102nd Foot
- The Lancashire Lads – 47th (Lancashire) Regiment of Foot later 1st Battalion The Loyal North Lancashire Regiment
- Lancashire Cavalry – B (Duke of Lancaster's Own Yeomanry) Squadron, Queen's Own Yeomanry
- The Leather Hats – 8th (The King's) Regiment of Foot later The King's (Liverpool Regiment)
- The Lewisham Gunners – 4th London Brigade, Royal Field Artillery
- The Light Bobs – Oxfordshire and Buckinghamshire Light Infantry later The Light Infantry
- Lightning Conductors – Cheshire Regiment (a detachment of the 2nd Battalion was struck by lightning in 1899)
- The Lillywhites

– Leicestershire Regiment
– East Lancashire Regiment
– 109th Regiment of Foot later 2nd Battalion Leinster Regiment

- The Lillywhite Seventh – 7th Queen's Own Hussars
- The Lilywhites – 13th/18th Royal Hussars (QMO)
- Limmer's Own – 12th Lancers
- The Lincolnshire Poachers – Lincolnshire Regiment (from a traditional folk song)
- Linseed Lancers – Royal Army Medical Corps
- The Lions – The King's Own (Royal Lancaster Regiment) (from their cap badge)
- The Lions of England – Duke of Lancaster's Regiment
- The Liverpool Blues

– Liverpool Blues (Regiment), volunteer unit 1745–46
– 79th Regiment of Foot (Royal Liverpool Volunteers) 1778–84

- The Liverpool Militia – Irish Guards (due historically to large numbers of Liverpudlian Irish in their ranks)
- The 9th London and Lancs – 9th Battalion Devonshire Regiment (West Country Kitchener's Army battalion made up to strength with recruits from London and Lancashire)
- Lord Cardigan's Bloodhounds – 11th Hussars (Prince Albert's Own) (commanded for several years in the early nineteenth century by James Brudenell, 7th Earl of Cardigan)
- Lord Wellingtons Bodyguard – Northumberland Fusiliers
- Loyal Lincoln Volunteers – 81st Regiment of Foot (Loyal Lincoln Volunteers) later 2nd Battalion The Loyal North Lancashire Regiment
- The Lumpers – 1st Life Guards
- The Lumps – 2nd Battalion The Royal Inniskilling Fusiliers

== M ==
- The Macraes – 1st Battalion Seaforth Highlanders
- The Maple Leaves – 100th (Prince of Wales's Royal Canadian) Regiment of Foot
- The Meanee Boys – 22nd Foot (from the Battle of Miani)
- The Measurers – Royal Engineers
- The Mediterranean Greys – 50th Foot
- The Micks – Irish Guards (the term is not regarded as derogatory by the regiment)
- The Milestones – 1st Foot
- The Minden Boys – 20th Regiment of Foot later Lancashire Fusiliers
- The Models – 2nd Bn Grenadier Guards
- Monkeys – Royal Military Police
- The Moonrakers – The Wiltshire Regiment (from an old story about Wiltshiremen trying to rescue the reflection of the moon, thinking it had fallen in the village pond)
- The Mounted Micks – 4th Royal Irish Dragoon Guards (mildly derogatory name for Irishmen)
- The Mudlarks – Royal Engineers
- Murray's Bucks – 46th (South Devonshire) Regiment of Foot
- The Mutton Lancers – Queen's (Royal West Surrey) Regiment (from their Paschal Lamb and Flag badge)

== N ==
- The Namurs – Royal Irish Regiment (from their battle honour of 'Namur' gained in 1695, the first such honour granted to a regiment of the British Army)
- The Nanny Goats – The Royal Welsh Fusiliers
- The Night-Jars – 10th Battalion Manchester Regiment (after the nocturnal bird, for its success in night attacks during 1918)
- Nobody's Own – 20th Hussars (for a time, were almost the only British cavalry regiment not to have a prestigious honorary colonel with his or her title in the regimental name)
- The Norfolk Howards – The Norfolk Regiment
- The Norsets – 'Composite English Battalion' formed of reinforcement drafts for the 2nd Bn Norfolk Regiment and 2nd Bn Dorset Regiment during the Mesopotamian campaign in 1916
- The Nottingham Hosiers – 45th (Nottinghamshire) (Sherwood Foresters) Regiment of Foot – (lace-making was a traditional industry in Nottinghamshire)
- The Nottinghamshire Marksmen – Royal Sherwood Foresters Militia
- The Notts and Jocks – Sherwood Foresters (from their previous title, The Nottinghamshire and Derbyshire Regiment)
- The Nulli Secundus Club – The Coldstream Guards (from their motto: Nullis Secundus (Second to None))
- The Nut-Crackers – The Buffs

== O ==
- The Old Agamemnons – 69th (South Lincolnshire) Regiment of Foot later The Welsh Regiment
- The Old Bendovers – see Bendovers
- The Old Black Cuffs – 50th Foot – (from their black facings)
- The Old and Bold

– Northumberland Fusiliers
– West Yorkshire Regiment
– Worcestershire Regiment

- The Old Braggs – 28th Foot
- The Old Bucks – Bedfordshire Regiment (from 1782 to 1809, were the senior regiment raised in Buckinghamshire)
- The Old Buffs – The Buffs (East Kent Regiment)
- The Old Canaries – 11th Hussars (Prince Albert's Own)
- The Old County Regiment – 1st Royal Lancashire Militia (The Duke of Lancaster's Own) after a second regiment was raised in 1798
- The Old Dozen – 12th (The East Suffolk) Regiment of Foot later The Suffolk Regiment
- Old Eyes – Grenadier Guards
- The Old Farmers – 5th (Princess Charlotte of Wales's) Dragoon Guards later 5th Royal Inniskilling Dragoon Guards
- The Old Firms – 36th Foot
- Old Five and Threepences – 53rd (Shropshire) Regiment of Foot later 1st Battalion Shropshire Light Infantry
- The Old Fogs – 87th (Royal Irish Fusiliers) Regiment of Foot later 1st Battalion Royal Irish Fusiliers
- The Old Hundredth – 100th (Prince of Wales's Royal Canadian) Regiment of Foot later 1st Battalion Leinster Regiment
- The Old Iniskillings – Carabiniers (6th Dragoon Guards)
- The Old Immortals – 76th Regiment of Foot later 2nd Battalion Duke of Wellington's Regiment
- The Old Namurers – see The Namurs
- Old Oil Rags – 2nd Dragoons
- The Old Seven and Sixpennies – 76th Regiment of Foot
- The Old Sixteen – Bedfordshire Regiment
- The Old Stubborns – 45th (Nottinghamshire) Regiment of Foot later 1st Battalion The Sherwood Foresters
- Old Saucy Seventh – 7th Hussars
- Old Straws – 7th Hussars
- Old Stubborns – 45th Foot
- The Old Toughs – The Royal Dublin Fusiliers
- The Orange Lilies – 35th (Royal Sussex) Regiment of Foot later 1st Battalion Royal Sussex Regiment
- The Oxford Blues – Household Cavalry – (raised by Aubrey de Vere, 20th Earl of Oxford and uniformed in dark blue, the colour later adopted by Oxford University)

== P ==
- Paget's Irregular Horse – 4th Hussars
- Paddy's Blackguards – Royal Irish Regiment
- The Paras – The Parachute Regiment
- The Paschal Lambs – see Kirke's Lambs
- The Patent Safeties – Life Guards
- The Peacemakers – Bedfordshire Regiment (The regiment had no battle honours until 1882, when it was belatedly given those for the War of the Spanish Succession 170 years earlier; the regimental motto was misquoted as 'Thou Shalt not Kill')
- The People's Cav Royal Tank Regiment
- Perthshire Grey Breeks – 2nd Battalion The Cameronians (Scottish Rifles)
- The Piccadilly Allsorts – London Scottish
- The Piccadilly Butchers – Life Guards
- The Piccadilly Heroes – Paget's Horse (Recruited from London gentlemen's clubs; the 'PH' letters on their helmet flash also gave rise to the alternatives of 'Public House', 'Perfectly Harmless' and 'Phat-heads'.)
- The Piccadilly Peacocks – Westminster Dragoons
- The Pig and Whistle Light Infantry – Highland Light Infantry
- The Pigs – 76th Foot
- The Pills – Royal Army Medical Corps
- The Plymouth Argylls – composite battalion of Royal Marines and Argyll and Sutherland Highlanders formed in Malayan Campaign (Plymouth is one of the Marines' home bases, with Plymouth Argyle FC as its local football team)
- The Poachers – 2nd Battalion, Royal Anglian Regiment and The Lincolnshire Regiment (from the regimental quick march, "The Lincolnshire Poacher")
- The Pompadours – 56th (West Essex) Regiment of Foot later 2nd Battalion Essex Regiment later 3rd Battalion Royal Anglian Regiment
- Pontius Pilate's Bodyguard – 1st (Royal) Regiment of Foot, later The Royal Scots (they were the oldest regiment in the British Army and humorously claimed to date back to the time of Christ; in fact they were founded in 1633)
- The Poona Guards – East Yorkshire Regiment
- The Poona Pets – 109th Regiment of Foot (Bombay Infantry) later 2nd Battalion Leinster Regiment
- The Pot Hooks – 77th (East Middlesex) Regiment of Foot later 2nd Battalion Middlesex Regiment
- The Potters – 5th Battalion North Staffordshire Regiment recruited from The Potteries area around Stoke-on-Trent
- The Poultice Wallopers – Royal Army Medical Corps
- The Prince of Orange's Own Regiment – 35th Foot
- The Princes Street Lancers - Lothians and Border Horse
- The Printers – 2nd City of London Rifle Volunteers (unit recruited in Fleet Street from the printing works of Eyre & Spottiswoode and Associated Newspapers)
- The Pull-Throughs – 42nd (East Lancashire) Division (from their divisional number and generally small stature, like the 'Four-by-Two' inches of the flannel pull-through used to clean a rifle).
- The Pump and Tortoise – 38th (1st Staffordshire) Regiment of Foot later 1st Battalion South Staffordshire Regiment (from the regimental badge, a stylised fighting castle atop an equally stylised elephant)

== Q ==
- Blue Mafia – Queen's Own Highlanders
- Queen's Last Resort – Queen's Lancashire Regiment (humorous back-acronym)
- Queer Objects on Horseback – Queen's Own Oxfordshire Hussars (humorous back-acronym)
- Queers on Horseback – Queen's Own Hussars (humorous back-acronym)
- Quick Let's Run – Queen's Lancashire Regiment (humorous back-acronym)
- The Quill Drivers – Royal Army Pay Corps
- Quick And Ready And Never Caught – Queen Alexanders Royal Army Nursing Corps

== R ==
- Radio Cabs and Taxis – Royal Corps of Transport (humorous back-acronym)
- The Rag and Oil Company – Royal Army Ordnance Corps (humorous back-acronym)
- The Ragged Brigade – 13th Hussars
- The Ramnuggar Boys – 14th King's Hussars (from the Battle of Ramnagar in 1849)
- Rats After Mouldy Cheese – Royal Army Medical Corps (humorous back-acronym)
- The Ready Reckoners – Highland Regiments
- Really Large Corps – Royal Logistic Corps (humorous back-acronym)
- Reckless Chaps in Trucks – Royal Corps of Transport (humorous back-acronym)
- The Redbreasts – 5th Royal Irish Lancers
- The Redcaps – Royal Military Police (from their distinctive headgear)
- The Red Devils – The Parachute Regiment (Refers to either the use of Tunisian Red mud as camouflage or the red berets worn)
- The Red Feathers – 46th (South Devonshire) Regiment of Foot later 2nd Battalion Duke of Cornwall's Light Infantry
- Red Knights – 22nd (Cheshire) Regiment of Foot later Cheshire Regiment
- The Red Lancers – 16th Lancers (The only lancer regiment to retain the short-lived red uniform ordered by King William IV in 1830, the others having reverted to blue in 1846)
- The Regiment – Special Air Service (Refers to their successes in the field, a sarcastic belief that saying their name will summon them.)
- The Ribs – 3rd Bn Grenadier Guards. They were the first Infantry to officially serve on board navy ships as Marines
- Rice Crispy Tasters – Royal Corps of Transport (humorous back-acronym)
- Rickshaws, Cabs and Taxis – Royal Corps of Transport (humorous back-acronym)
- The Right of the Line – Royal Horse Artillery (from their privileged position on ceremonial parade)
- Rob All My Comrades – Royal Army Medical Corps (derogatory back-acronym from the belief that medical personnel took advantage of their position to steal from casualties)
- Rob All Our Comrades – Royal Army Ordnance Corps
- Roll on Death – Royal Engineers' Railway Operating Department
- The Rollickers – 89th (The Princess Victoria's) Regiment of Foot later 2nd Battalion Royal Irish Fusiliers
- The Romulans – Royal Mercian and Lancastrian Yeomanry (RMLY)
- The Rorys – The Argyll and Sutherland Highlanders
- Rough Engineering Made Easy – Royal Electrical and Mechanical Engineers (humorous back-acronym)
- Royal Army Overseas Commandos – Royal Army Ordnance Corps (humorous back-acronym)
- Royal Engineers Made Easy – Royal Electrical and Mechanical Engineers (humorous back-acronym)
- The Royal Goats – The Royal Welsh Fusiliers
- The Royal Tigers – York and Lancaster Regiment
- Run Away, Someone's Coming – Royal Army Service Corps (humorous back-acronym)
- Rusty Buckles – 2nd Dragoon Guards (Queen's Bays)

== S ==
- The Sandbags – Grenadier Guards
- The Scarlet Lancers – 16th The Queen's Lancers later 16th/5th The Queen's Royal Lancers – the only British lancer regiment to wear red rather than blue uniforms from 1830 to World War I
- The Sanguinary Sweeps – King's Royal Rifle Corps (from the red facings on their Rifle green (almost black) uniform)
- The Saturday and Sundays - The Territorial Force and later the Army Reserve (United Kingdom), in reference to their weekend training program.
- The Saucy Greens – Worcestershire Regiment (from the duck green facing colour of their uniform)
- The Saucy Notts – Royal Sherwood Foresters Militia
- The Saucy Pompeys – 56th Foot
- Saucy Sixth – 6th Regiment of Foot later Royal Warwickshire Regiment
- Saucy Seventh – 7th Queen's Own Hussars
- Sauvages d'Ecosse – Black Watch
- Scaly Backs – Royal Signals
- The Shiners – Northumberland Fusiliers – from their high standard of spit and polish
- The Shiny Fourth – 4th London Brigade, Royal Field Artillery
- The Shiny Seventh – 7th (City of London) Battalion, London Regiment – being the only red-coated and brass-buttoned battalion in a brigade otherwise uniformed in rifle green with black buttons
- The Shiny Tenth – 10th Royal Hussars
- The Shiny Twelfth – 12th (Service) Battalion, East Surrey Regiment (Bermondsey)
- The Shropshire Gunners – 181st Field Regiment, Royal Artillery – on conversion from a battalion of the King's Shropshire Light Infantry, there was a shortage of RA insignia, so the men were ordered to cut the 'KING'S' and 'L.I.' from their shoulder titles, leaving the word 'Shropshire'
- The Skilljngers – Carabiniers (6th Dragoon Guards)
- The Skins

– 6th (Inniskilling) Dragoons
– Royal Inniskilling Fusiliers

- Skull and Crossbones – 17th Lancers (see Death and Glory Boys)
- The Sleepy Queens – Queen's Royal Regiment (West Surrey)
- Slop Jockeys = The Army Catering Corps
- The Snappers – East Yorkshire Regiment
- The Splashers – The Wiltshire Regiment
- The Sprats – 94th Foot
- The Springers

– 62nd (Wiltshire) Regiment of Foot
– The Wiltshire Regiment
– The Lincolnshire Regiment

- The Staffordshire Knot – 80th Regiment of Foot (Staffordshire Volunteers) later 2nd Battalion South Staffordshire Regiment
- The Star of the Line – Worcestershire Regiment (from the elongated star forming part of the regimental badge)
- The Steelbacks

– 57th (West Middlesex) Regiment of Foot later 1st Battalion Middlesex Regiment
– The Northamptonshire Regiment
– 3rd Battalion, Royal Anglian Regiment (Army Reserve)

- The Steel Heads – 109th Regiment of Foot (Bombay Infantry) later 2nd Battalion Leinster Regiment
- The Stickies – The Royal Ulster Rifles (83rd & 86th)
- Stink – Special Brigade, Royal Engineers (responsible for poison gas and flame attacks)
- Stonewallers – 37th Foot
- The Stoney Lane Boys – 3rd South Midland Brigade, Royal Field Artillery (from their headquarters at Stoney Lane, Balsall Heath)
- Strada Reale Highlanders – Gordon Highlanders
- Strawboots

– 7th Dragoon Guards
– 7th Hussars

- The Sugar Stick Brigade – Royal Army Ordnance Corps
- The Supple Twelfth – 12th Royal Lancers
- The Surprisers – 46th (South Devonshire) Regiment of Foot
- The Sussex Sappers – 1st Sussex Engineers
- The Sweeps – 95th Rifles later The Rifle Brigade (from their black facings)

== T ==
- The Tabs – 15th The King's Hussars later 15th/19th The King's Royal Hussars
- 1st Tangerines – 2nd Foot (originally raised for the garrison of Tangiers)
- The Tankies – Royal Tank Regiment specifically, rather than cavalry units equipped with tanks – this differentiates from "tankers" as the US army term for all tank soldiers
- The Tartan Tankies 4th Royal Tank Regiment
- The Tearaways – 49th Foot
- Teenie Weenie Airlines – Army Air Corps
- THEM – Special Air Service – relates to the hush-hush nature of most of their work, where it wouldn't be prudent to mention their name, coined by Auld Sapper.
- The Thin Red Line – 93rd (Sutherland Highlanders) Regiment of Foot later The Argyll and Sutherland Highlanders
- The Three Quarter Lancers – 9th/12th Royal Lancers (humorous simplification of regimental title)
- The Three Tens – 30th Foot later East Lancashire Regiment
- The Tigers – 67th (South Hampshire) Regiment of Foot who amalgamated with 37th (North Hampshire) Regiment of Foot to form the Hampshire Regiment in 1881 and now Princess of Wales's Royal Regiment (after the Royal Tiger badge awarded to the 67th in honour of 21 years continuous service in India)
- The Tin Bellies – 1st Life Guards and 2nd Life Guards
- Titchburns Own – Carabiniers (6th Dragoon Guards)
- The T'Others – 13th Battalion East Yorkshire Regiment
- The Tow Rows – Grenadier Guards
- The Trades Union – 1st King's Dragoon Guards
- The Trifles – the Rifles
- The Triple Xs – 30th Regiment of Foot later East Lancashire Regiment
- The Twin Roses – York and Lancaster Regiment
- The Two Fours – 44th (East Essex) Regiment of Foot later 1st Battalion Essex Regiment
- The Two Fives – 55th (Westmorland) Regiment of Foot later 2nd Battalion Border Regiment
- The Two Tens – 20th Regiment of Foot later Lancashire Fusiliers
- The Two Twos – 22nd (Cheshire) Regiment of Foot
- THOSE – Special Boat Service – for same reasons as per THEM above. As in, being one of THEM or one of THOSE.

== U ==
- The Ups and Downs – 69th (South Lincolnshire) Regiment of Foot later The Welsh Regiment – because the number 69 reads the same either way up

== V ==
- The Vein Openers – 29th (Worcestershire) Regiment of Foot later Worcestershire Regiment (refers to involvement of the 29th in the Boston Massacre)
- The Vikings – 1st Battalion Royal Anglian Regiment
- Virgin Mary's Guard – 7th Dragoon Guards
- The Vulgar Fractions – 16/5th Lancers

== W ==
- Wardour's Horse – The Welsh Regiment
- The Warwickshire Lads – Royal Warwickshire Regiment
- Wellington's Body Guard – 5th Foot
- Wenlock's Horse – East Riding of Yorkshire Yeomanry (after the unit's first commanding officer, Beilby Lawley, 3rd Baron Wenlock)
- The Whisky Blenders – 34th Foot
- The White Stars – 7th Hussars
- The Whitewashers – 61st Foot
- The Wild Indians – 100th (Prince of Wales's Royal Canadian) Regiment of Foot
- Wolfe's Own – 47th (Lancashire) Regiment of Foot later 1st Battalion The Loyal North Lancashire Regiment
- The Wonkey Donkeys – Berkshire Yeomanry
- The Woofers – Worcestershire and Sherwood Foresters Regiment (pronunciation of WFR)
- Wright's Irregulars – 582nd Moonlight Battery, Royal Artillery (after the unit's commanding officer)

== X ==
- The XV – 20th Hussars

== Y ==
- The Young Bucks – 85th Foot
- The Young Buffs – 31st (Huntingdonshire) Regiment of Foot later 1st Battalion East Surrey Regiment (to distinguish them from the Old Buffs (3rd Foot) who also wore buff facings)
- Young Eyes – 7th Hussars
- Young and Livelies – York and Lancaster Regiment

== See also ==
- List of nicknames of United States Army divisions
- Lists of nicknames
- Regimental nicknames of the Canadian Forces
