= USS Gato =

USS Gato has been the name of more than one United States Navy ship, and may refer to:

- USS Gato (SS-212), a Gato-class submarine, in commission from 1941 to 1946
- USS Gato (SSN-615), a submarine in commission from 1968 to 1996
