= El Gato Negro (disambiguation) =

El Gato Negro (Spanish, 'The Black Cat') is the name of two comic book superheroes.

El Gato Negro may also refer to:

- El Gato Negro (comic book), the original comic book series to feature the characters
- El Gato (TV series), based on the comic books
- "El Gato Negro" (song), a popular corrido
  - Ruben Ramos (musician), nicknamed El Gato Negro because of the song
- René Velázquez Valenzuela (died 2016), Mexican suspected assassin nicknamed El Gato Negro
- El Gato Negro (café), a historic a coffeehouse in Buenos Aires, Argentina

== See also ==
- Gato (disambiguation)
- Gato Negro, an album by 7 Year Bitch
- Gato Negro station, metro station in Caracas
