= Royal Scots Dragoon Guards =

Cavalry regiment of the British Army

Royal Scots Dragoon Guards (Carabiniers and Greys)
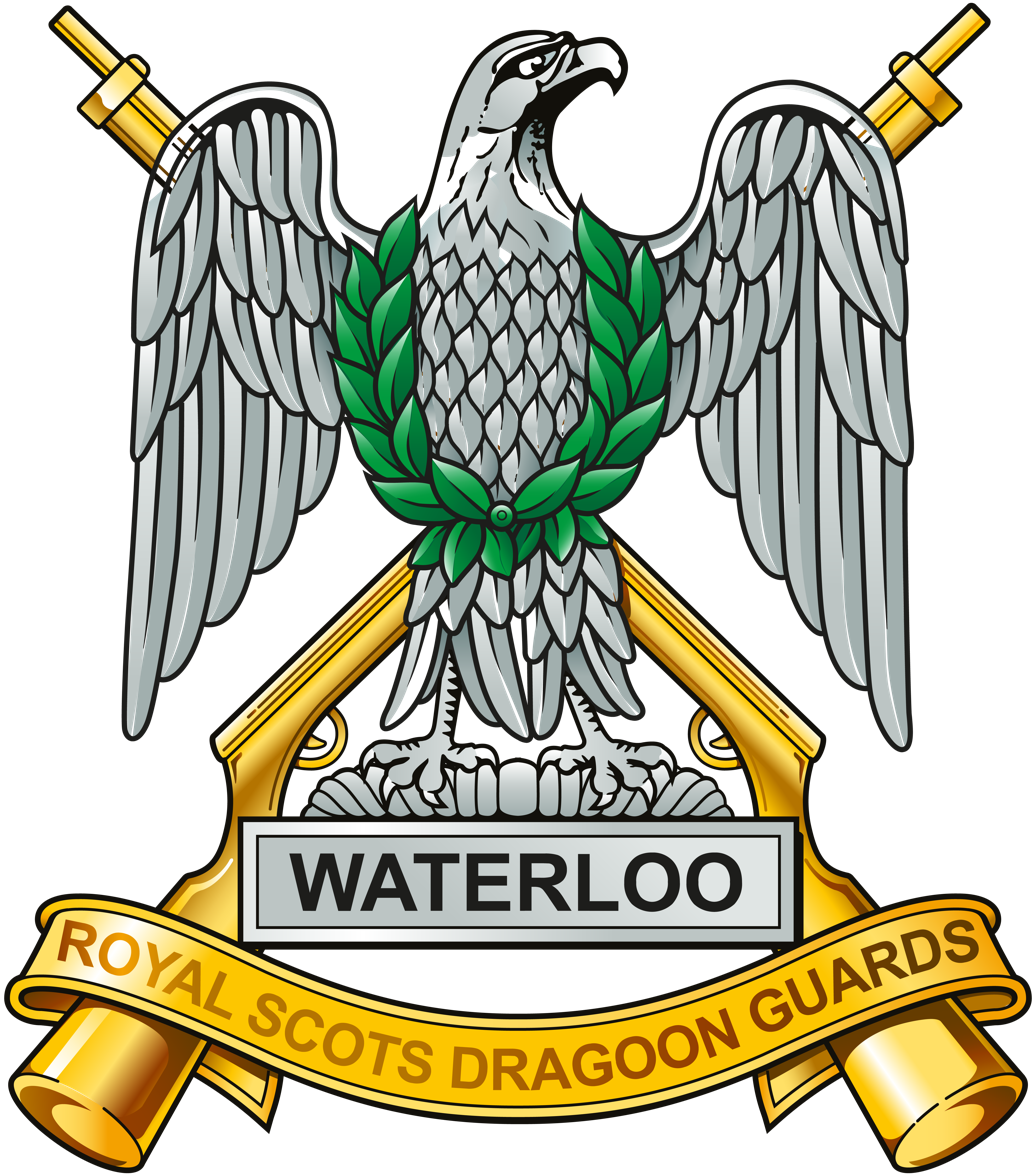
- Cap badge of the Royal Scots Dragoon Guards
- Active: 2 July 1971 – present
- Country: United Kingdom
- Branch: British Army
- Type: Dragoon Guards
- Role: Light cavalry
- Size: One regiment
- Part of: Royal Armoured Corps
- Garrison/HQ: Home HQ – Edinburgh Castle; Regiment – Waterloo Lines, Leuchars Station
- Mottos: Nemo me impune lacessit (No one provokes me with impunity); Ich Dien (I Serve); Second to None
- March: Quick (band) – The 3DGs; (pipes & drums) – Hielan' Laddie; Slow (band) – The Garb of Old Gaul; (pipes & drums) – My Home
- Mascot: None (as of 2021)
- Anniversaries: 13 April (Nunshigum); 18 June (Waterloo); 25 October (Balaklava)
- Website: www.army.mod.uk/who-we-are/corps-regiments-and-units/royal-armoured-corps/royal-scots-dragoon-guards/ , https://www.scotsdg.org.uk

Commanders
- Colonel-in-Chief: King Charles III
- Deputy Colonel-in-Chief: Prince Edward, Duke of Kent
- Colonel of the Regiment: Brigadier Ben Edwards
- Regimental Sergeant Major: WO1 Ant Greives
- Commanding Officer: Lieutenant Colonel Chris Majcher

Insignia
- Tactical Recognition Flash
- Arm Badge: Prince of Wales's feathers from 3rd Dragoon Guards (Prince of Wales's)
- Tartan: Royal Stewart (Pipers kilts and plaids)
- Abbreviation: SCOTS DG

The Royal Scots Dragoon Guards (Carabiniers and Greys) is a light cavalry regiment of the British Army, and the senior Scottish regiment. The regiment, through the Royal Scots Greys, is the oldest surviving Cavalry Regiment of the Line in the British Army. The regiment is based at Waterloo Lines, Leuchars Station, and forms part of the 7th Light Mechanised Brigade.

== History ==
The Royal Scots Dragoon Guards were formed on 2 July 1971 at Holyrood, Edinburgh, by the amalgamation of the 3rd Carabiniers (Prince of Wales's Dragoon Guards) (themselves the product of the amalgamation in 1922 of 3rd Dragoon Guards (Prince of Wales's) and 6th Dragoon Guards (Carabiniers), and The Royal Scots Greys (2nd Dragoons).

Soon after, the regiment deployed on four tours of Northern Ireland in 1972, 1974, 1976 and 1980, suffering one fatality in 1972, when Trooper Ian Hunter Caie was killed by a bomb in a beer barrel that exploded in the path of his Ferret scout car in Moybane, near Crossmaglen County Armagh.

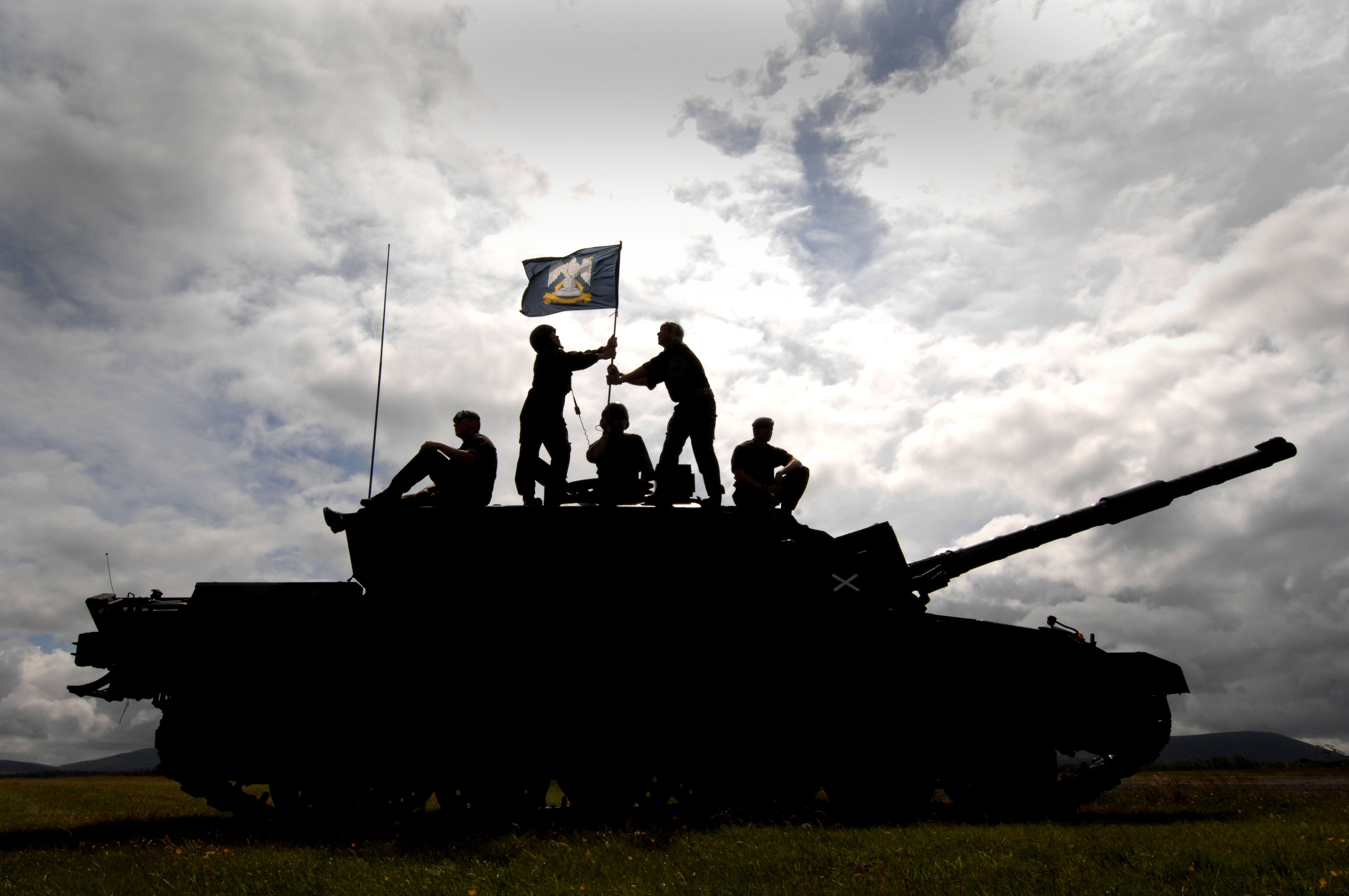
The Royal Scots Dragoon Guards raise the regimental flag on their Challenger 2

The regiment saw active service during the Gulf War in 1991 deploying 57 Challenger tanks and in Bosnia as part of SFOR in 1996–97. In 1998, it became the first regiment in the British Army to operate the Challenger 2 main battle tank. It deployed to Kosovo, as part of KFOR, in 2000.

The regiment deployed to Iraq for Operation Telic, the British element of the 2003 invasion of Iraq. The bulk of the regiment deployed as part of the Scots Dragoon Guards Battle Group with a single squadron (A Squadron) detached to the First Battalion The Black Watch Battle Group. All deployed elements of the regiment took part in the advance on Iraq's second largest city, Basra. Prior to reaching Basra, A Squadron fought in and around Az Zubayr and C Squadron was detached from the SCOTS DG BG to fight with 3 Commando Brigade in actions south of Basra that included Britain's largest tank engagement since the Gulf War, when 14 Challenger 2 tanks engaged and destroyed 14 Iraqi tanks (the so-called "14–0" engagement).

The regiment saw more deployments to Iraq in 2006 and 2008, where it suffered two casualties, Lieutenant Richard Palmer and Corporal Gordon Pritchard. In 2008, 2011 and 2013/14 the regiment deployed to Afghanistan. The pipes and drums distinguished themselves, winning the award for Album of the Year at the 2009 Classical Brits for Spirit of the Glen: Journey, recorded on active service.

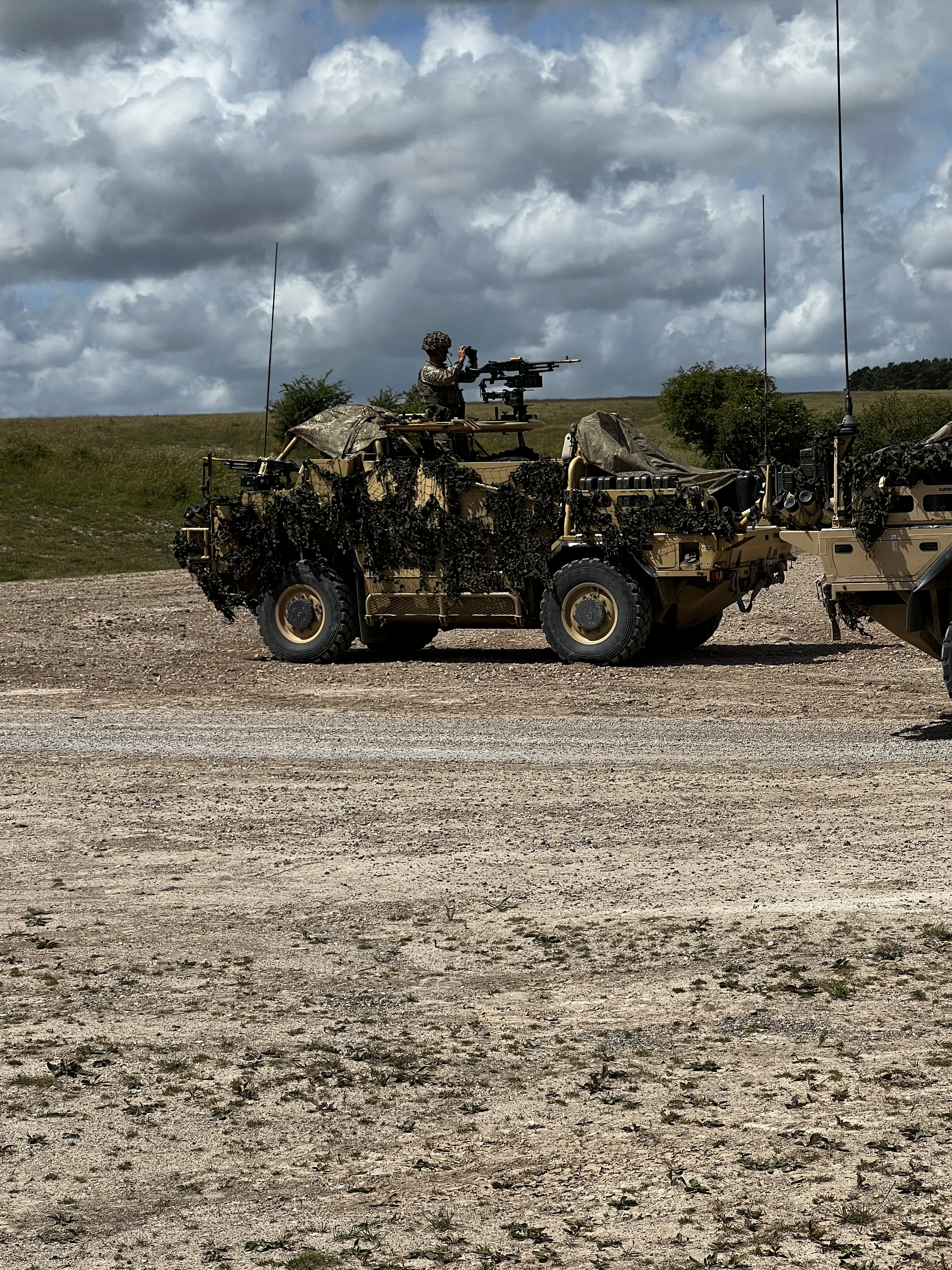
Jackal 2 with SCOTS DG

In November 2013, the unit was converted to a light cavalry unit, armed with Jackal vehicles. Under the Army 2020 plan, it was re-roled as a light cavalry unit, and moved to Leuchars Station in summer 2015. On 29 September 2015, Queen Elizabeth II visited Leuchars, where she named the north part of the camp "Waterloo Lines" in celebration of 200 years since the Battle of Waterloo.

The Regiment deployed to Cyprus with the United Nations on Operation TOSCA 27, where they conducted peace-keeping for six months from September 2017.

The Regiment deployed to Poland in 2019 and 2020 on Operation CABRIT as part of the NATO Enhanced Forward Presence Poland Battlegroup on two separate six month deployments with the A Squadron lead contingent named "Dragoon Troop" and the C Squadron lead Contingent named "Balaklava Troop".

Throughout the COVID-19 pandemic, the unit deployed on Operation RESCRIPT where they assisted the NHS and local authorities across the UK.

In 2022, the unit was transferred to the 7th Light Mechanised Brigade as part of the Future Soldier reorganisation. It was then deployed to Mali on Operation Newcombe.

== Organisation ==
The regiment converted to the role of light cavalry as part of restructuring in the army under Army 2020. It is equipped with Jackal armoured fighting vehicles. The Royal Scots Dragoon Guards is paired with the Scottish and North Irish Yeomanry, an Army Reserve light cavalry regiment.

The Royal Scots Dragoon Guards is made up of the following sub-units:

- Regimental Headquarters based at Edinburgh Castle
- Armoured Regiment Headquarters
  - Headquarters Squadron – MAN Support vehicles, Land Rovers and Panther CLV equipped
    - Pipes and Drums of the Royal Scots Dragoon Guards
  - A Squadron – Jackal equipped
  - B Squadron (Mutants) – Jackal equipped
  - C Squadron – Jackal equipped

In common with other cavalry regiments of the British Army, all soldiers with the rank of OR-2 are called 'Troopers'.

== Regimental museum ==
The Royal Scots Dragoon Guards Museum is situated at Edinburgh Castle. Opened in 2006, the exhibits include uniforms, medals, weapons, regalia, music and the French Imperial Eagle that was captured by Sergeant Charles Ewart of the Royal Scots Greys from the French 45th Régiment d'Infanterie de Ligne at the Battle of Waterloo.

== Official abbreviation ==
The regiment's official abbreviation (as listed in Joint Service Publication 101 (Service Writing)) is SCOTS DG, the format of which follows the traditional Cavalry line.

== Accoutrements and uniform ==
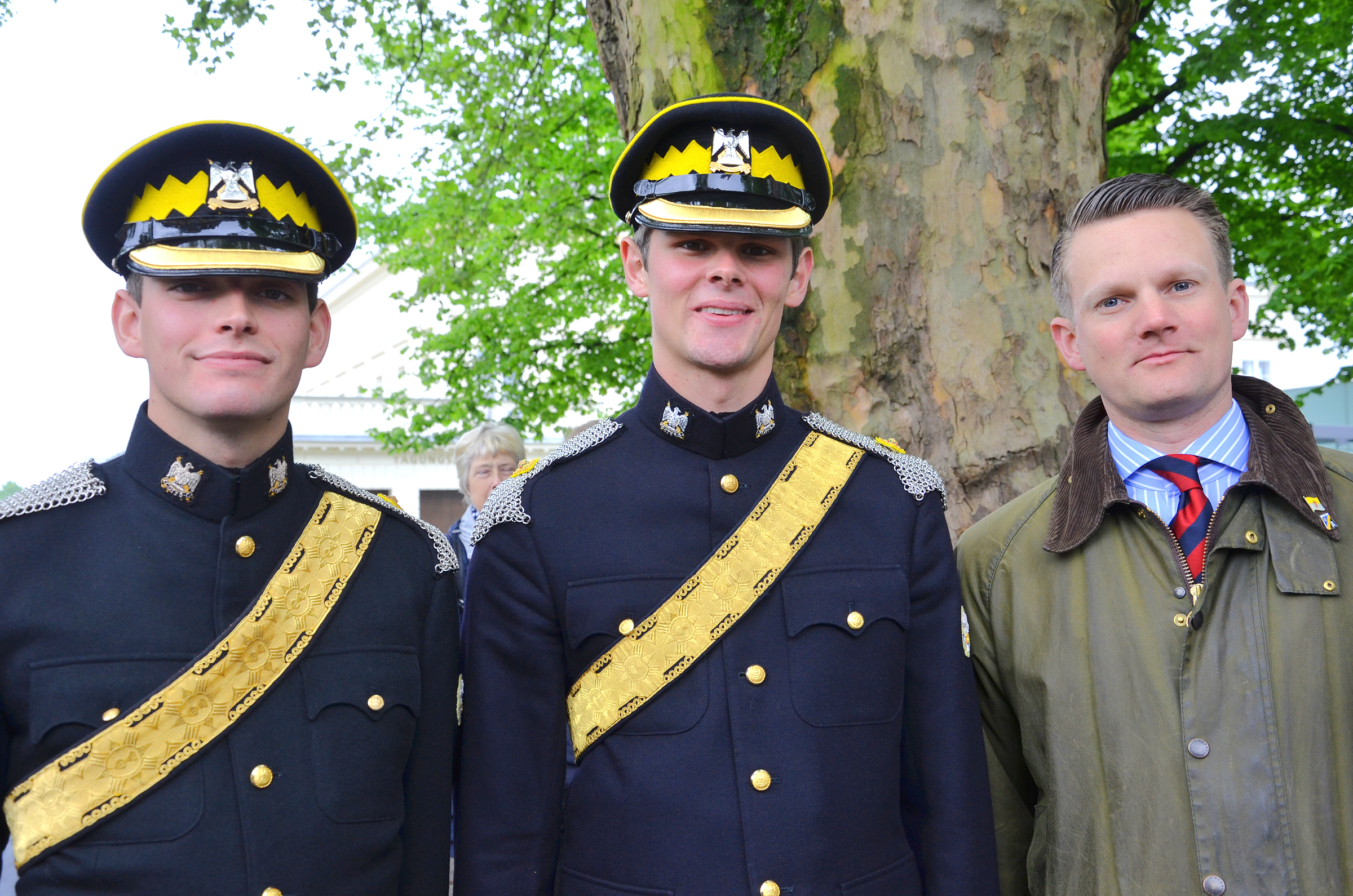
Subalterns of the SCOTS DG in No.1 dress uniform

The cap badge features an eagle, which represents the French Imperial Eagle that was captured by Sergeant Charles Ewart of the Royal Scots Greys from the French 45th Regiment of Foot at the Battle of Waterloo. It is always worn with a black backing in mourning for Tsar Nicholas II, the last Tsar of Russia, who was their Colonel-in-Chief at the time of his execution. The cap badge also has the crossed carbines of the 3rd Carabiniers at the rear of the eagle.

The Plume of The Prince of Wales with its motto Ich Dien is worn by all members of the Regiment embroidered on the upper part of the left sleeve. The right to wear this badge was granted to the 3rd Dragoon Guards in 1765; it subsequently became the regiment's cap badge and later, with the crossed carabines, formed the badge of the 3rd Carabiniers (Prince of Wales's).

The distinctive yellow zigzag (or "vandyke") cap band was inherited from the Royal Scots Greys, who had worn it since the mid-19th century.

As a royal regiment, the Royal Scots Dragoon Guards is permitted to wear the Royal Stewart tartan, which was a privilege granted by King George VI, and is worn by the regiment's pipers.

== Regimental mottos ==
- The regimental motto is Nemo Me Impune Lacessit (No one provokes me with impunity), also the motto of the Order of the Thistle, to which it refers.
- The regiment also uses the motto "Second to None".

== Traditions ==
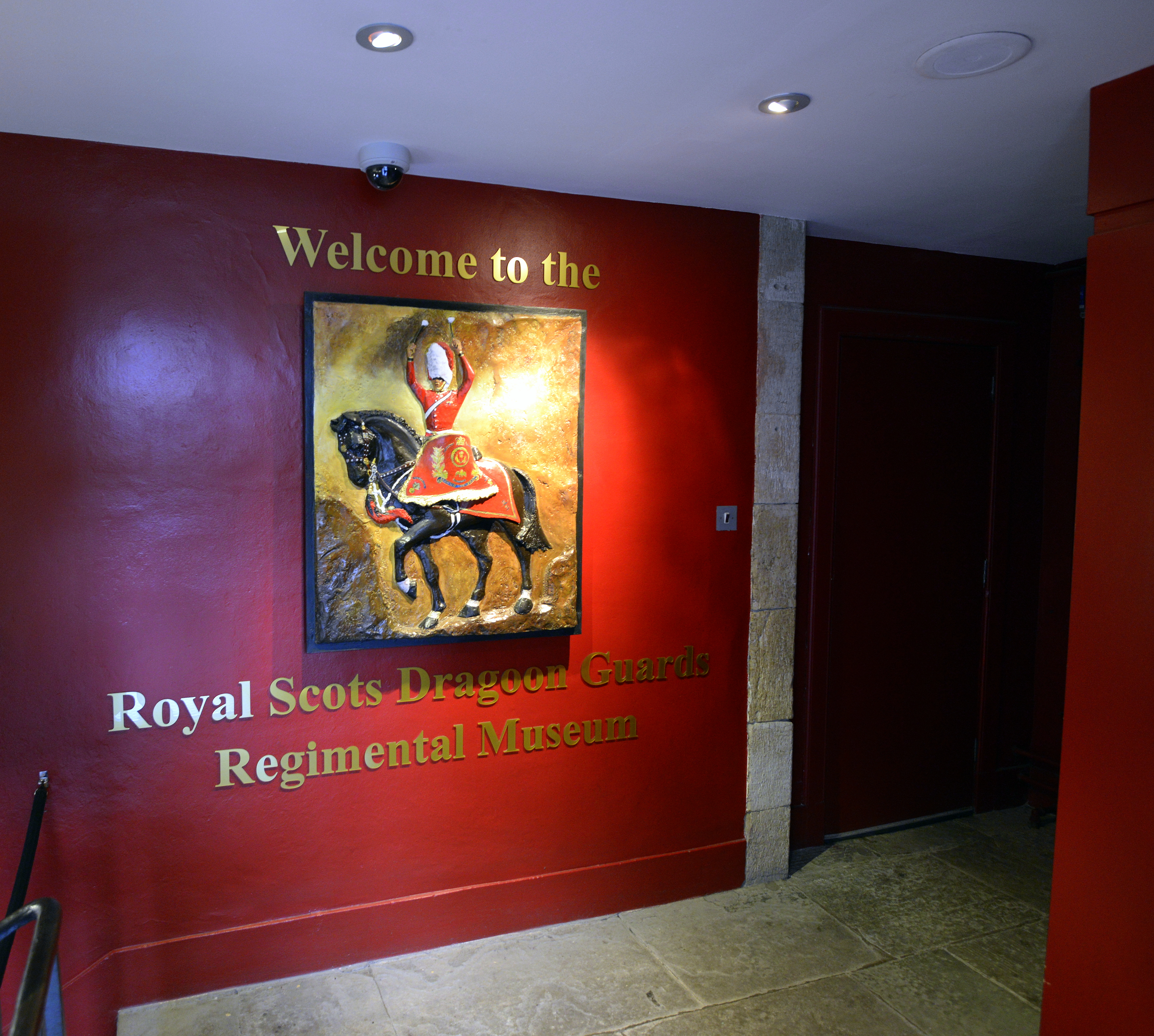
Royal Scots Dragoon Guards Kettle Drummer wearing a white bearskin

The Loyal Toast is drunk at formal dinners in the Mess and is always taken seated, except when Royalty is present. On evenings when a military band is present, besides playing God Save the King the band also plays "God Bless the Prince of Wales", an old 3rd Dragoon Guards custom, and the "Imperial Russian Anthem" in memory of Tsar Nicholas II, the Colonel-in-Chief of the Scots Greys, murdered with his family during the Russian Civil War (1918).

== Pipes and drums ==
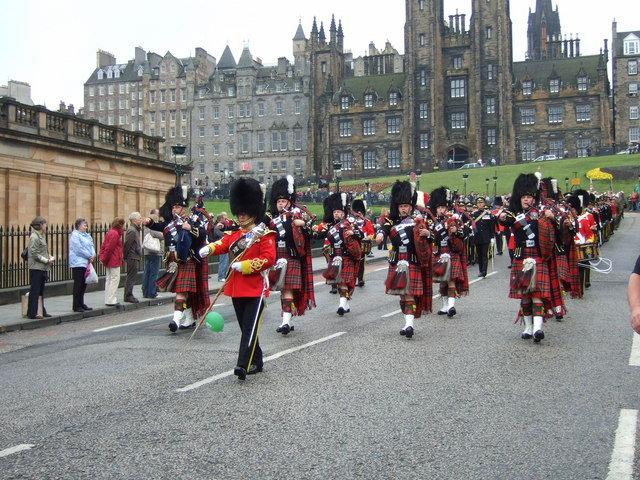
The Pipes and Drums on Armed Forces Day

External videos
- "Amazing Grace" performed by the Royal Scots Dragoon Guards on YouTube

The regiment has its own pipe band, who were first formed in 1946 and tour widely, performing in competitions, concerts and parades. It was the first official organized pipes and drums in the history of the regiment. Their most famous piece is "Amazing Grace", which reached number one in the charts in the United Kingdom, Ireland, Australia, New Zealand, Canada, and South Africa in 1972. The track sold over seven million copies by mid 1977, and was awarded a gold disc. The track was also featured in the 1978 version of Invasion of the Body Snatchers. In Canada, the originating LP, Farewell To The Greys, was number nine for four weeks, beginning 24 June 1972.

The band released a new CD in late November 2007 through Universal Music, featuring a number of classic pipe tunes along with some modern arrangements, which was recorded while the regiment was based in Iraq. The album Spirit of the Glen was produced by Jon Cohen and released by Universal on 26 November 2007. It was a remake of their most popular song "Amazing Grace" and featured the Czech Film Orchestra. Spirit of the Glen was officially launched at Edinburgh Castle and won Album of the Year at the 2009 Classical Brits. They have also made regular appearances at the Royal Edinburgh Military Tattoo over the years.

The bass drummer parades with a distinctive white bearskin cap with red plume. Adopted in 1887 for the jubilee of Queen Victoria, it was originally worn by the mounted kettle drummer of the band. At some point, the cap passed to the pipes and drums of the regiment. Folklore has it that the white bearskin was presented to the regiment by Tsar Nicholas II, the Colonel-in-Chief of the Royal Scots Greys, however this is incorrect according to the regimental history. Additionally, pictures exist of this cap in use by the regimental kettle drummer prior to 1894 when Tsar Nicholas II was crowned.

== Band ==
Following the formation of the new regiment, the regimental bands of the 3rd Dragoon Guards and The Royal Scots Greys merged to form the Band of The Royal Scots Dragoon Guards. The band deployed with the regiment on all operations, including during the Gulf War. Following significant reductions to the army in 1994, the band amalgamated with the Band of the Queen's Dragoon Guards and Band of the Royal Dragoon Guards to form the new, smaller, Band of the Dragoon Guards. The percussion section of the new band, as an ode to The Royal Scots Greys, wore bearskins with a large crimson plume extending over the crest of the cap and black pants lined with yellow stripes. This was a direct copy of The Royal Scots Greys band's old uniforms. In addition, the Drum Major's uniform consisted of a black bearskin with large crimson plume over the crest of the cap and yellow pants, with the tunic of the Royal Dragoon Guards.

In 2006, this band amalgamated with the Cambrai Band of the Royal Tank Regiment to form the Heavy Cavalry and Cambrai Band, maintaining the percussion uniforms of the old band. Following the formation of the Band of the Royal Armoured Corps, the bearskin cap was lost, but the black and yellow pants were carried over.

== Commanding officers ==
The commanding officers have been:

- 1971–1972: Lt.-Col. Anthony J. Bateman
- 1972–1974: Lt.-Col. John Norman Stewart Arthur
- 1974–1977: Lt.-Col. Stephen R. A. Stopford
- 1977–1979: Lt.-Col. Charles A. Ramsay
- 1979–1982: Lt.-Col. C. Roland S. Notley
- 1982–1984: Lt.-Col. Marcus E. C. Coombs
- 1984–1986: Lt.-Col. Jonathan Michael Francis Cooper Hall
- 1986–1988: Lt.-Col. Melville Stewart Jameson
- 1988–1991: Lt.-Col. John F. B. Sharples
- 1991–1993: Lt.-Col. Nicholas D. A. Seymour
- 1993–1995: Lt.-Col. Simon R. B. Allen
- 1995–1997: Lt.-Col. R. Austen B. Ramsden
- 1997–2000: Lt.-Col. Andrew M. Phillips
- 2000–2002: Lt.-Col. H. David Allfrey
- 2002–2004: Lt.-Col. Hugh H. Blackman
- 2004–2006: Lt.-Col. Benjamin P. Edwards
- 2006–2009: Lt.-Col. Felix G. Gedney
- 2009–2011: Lt.-Col. Jonathan U. Biggart
- 2011–2013: Lt.-Col. Jonathan G. E. Bartholomew
- 2013–2016: Lt.-Col. Benjamin J. Cattermole
- 2016–2018: Lt.-Col. Dominic C. D. Coombes
- 2018–2021: Lt.-Col. J. Fraser S. McLeman
- 2021–2022: Lt.-Col. Graeme G. Craig
- 2022–2026 : Lt.-Col. Ben Parkyn
- 2026-Present Lt.-Col. Chris Majcher

== Order of precedence ==
| Preceded by 1st The Queen's Dragoon Guards | Cavalry Order of Precedence | Succeeded by Royal Dragoon Guards |

== Lineage ==
| 1881 Childers Reforms | 1922 Amalgamations | 1957 Defence White Paper | 1966 Defence White Paper - today |
|---|---|---|---|
| 3rd (Prince of Wales's) Dragoon Guards | 3rd Carabiniers (Prince of Wales's Dragoon Guards) | | Royal Scots Dragoon Guards (Carabiniers and Greys) |
| 6th Dragoon Guards (Carabiniers) | 3rd Carabiniers (Prince of Wales's Dragoon Guards) | | Royal Scots Dragoon Guards (Carabiniers and Greys) |
| 2nd Dragoons (Royal Scots Greys) | | | Royal Scots Dragoon Guards (Carabiniers and Greys) |

== Alliances ==
- Australia – 12th/16th Hunter River Lancers
- Canada – The Windsor Regiment (RCAC)
- South Africa – Ingobamakhosi Carbineers

=== Bonds of friendship ===
- Royal Navy – HMS Vengeance
- Royal Navy – HMS Glasgow

=== Affiliated yeomanry ===
- British Army – Scottish and North Irish Yeomanry

=== Former ===
- New Zealand – The New Zealand Scottish Regiment (disbanded in 2016)

== Battle honours ==
The Royal Scots Dragoon Guards (Carabiners and Greys) inherited all of its antecedent regiments' battle honours when it was formed in 1971. These consist of:

3rd Dragoon Guards (Prince of Wales's)

- Early Wars: Blenheim, Ramillies, Oudenarde, Malplaquet, Warburg, Beaumont, Willems, Talavera, Albuhera, Vittoria, Peninsula, Abyssinia, South Africa 1901–02.
- The Great War: Ypres 1914, 1915, Nonne Bosschen, Frezenberg, Loos, Arras 1917, Scarpe 1917, Somme 1918, St. Quentin, Avre, Amiens, Hindenburg Line, Beaurevoir, Cambrai 1918, Pursuit to Mons, France and Flanders 1914–18.

Carabiniers (6th Dragoon Guards)

- Early Wars: Blenheim, Ramillies, Oudenarde, Malplaquet, Warburg, Willems, Sevastopol, Delhi 1857, Afghanistan 1879–80, Relief of Kimberley, Paardeberg, South Africa 1899–1902
- The Great War: Mons, Le Cateau, Retreat from Mons, Marne 1914, Aisne 1914, Messines 1914, Armentières 1914, Ypres 1915, St. Julien, Bellewaarde, Arras 1917 Scarpe 1917, Cambrai 1917 '18, Somme 1918, St. Quentin, Lys, Hazebrouck, Amiens, Bapaume 1918, Hindenburg Line, Canal du Nord, Selle, Sambre, Pursuit to Mons, France and Flanders 1914–18

3rd Carabiniers (Prince of Wales's Dragoon Guards) (Note: Themselves having inherited the battle honours of the 3rd Dragoon Guards (Prince of Wales's) and the Carabiniers (6th Dragoon Guards) upon amalgamation in 1922.)

- The Second World War: Tamu Road, Nunshigum, Imphal, Bishenpur, Kanglatongbi, Kennedy Peak, Shwebo, Sagaing, Ava, Mandalay, Yenangyuang 1945, Irrawuddy, Burma 1944–45

Royal Scots Greys (2nd Dragoons)

- Early wars: Blenheim, Ramillies, Oudenarde, Malplaquet, Dettingen, Warburg, Willems, Waterloo, Balaklava, Sevastopol, Relief of Kimberley, Paardeberg, South Africa, 1899–1902
- The Great War: Mons, Retreat from Mons, Marne 1914, Aisne 1914, Messines 1914, Ypres 1914 '15, Gheluvelt, Neuve Chapelle, St. Julien, Bellewaarde, Arras 1917, Scarpe 1917, Cambrai 1917 '18, Lys, Hazebrouck, Amiens, Somme 1918, Albert 1918, Bapaume 1918, Hindenburg Line, St Quentin Canal, Beaurevoir, Pursuit to Mons, France and Flanders 1914–18
- The Second World War: Caen, Hill 112, Falaise, Venlo Pocket, Hochwald, Aller, Bremen, North-West Europe 1944–45, Merjayun, Syria 1941, Alam El Halfa, El Alamein, El Agheila, Nofilia, Advance on Tripoli, North Africa 1942–43, Salerno, Battipaglia, Volturno Crossing, Italy 1943

Royal Scots Dragoon Guards (Carabiniers and Greys)

- Recent wars: Wadi Al Batin, Gulf War 1991, Al Basrah, Iraq 2003

== Colonel-in-Chief ==
- 1971–2022: Queen Elizabeth II
- 2023–present: King Charles III

=== Deputy Colonel-in-Chief ===
- 1994–present: Field Marshal Prince Edward, Duke of Kent KG GCMG GCVO CD ADC FRS

== Regimental colonels ==
Colonels of the Regiment have been:

- 1971–1975: Major General Ralph Younger
- 1975–1979: Colonel Hugh Brassey
- 1979–1984: Field Marshal Sir John Wilfred Stanier
- 1984–1992: Lieutenant General Sir Norman Arthur
- 1992–1998: Major General Charles Ramsay
- 1998–2003: Major General Jonathan Michael Francis Cooper Hall
- 2003–2008: Brigadier Sir Melville Stewart Jameson
- 2008–2013: Brigadier Simon Allen
- 2013–2021: Brigadier David Allfrey
- 2021–present: Brigadier Ben Edwards

== See also ==
- Armed forces in Scotland
- Military history of Scotland

== Bibliography ==
- Doyle, Peter; Foster, Chris (2010). British Army Cap Badges of the Second World War. Shire Collections. ISBN 978-0747807971.
- Nicoletti, Tony; Stephen, Aidan (2003). Shot and Captured: Photographs of the Royal Scots Dragoon Guards Battlegroup in Iraq 2003. Scottish Daily Record and Sunday Mail.
- Wood, Stephen (1988). In the Finest Tradition: The Royal Scots Dragoon Guards (Carabiniers & Greys): Its History and Treasures. Mainstream Pub. Co. ISBN 1-85158-174-X.
