= 1 Close Support Battalion REME =

1st Close Support Battalion, Royal Electrical and Mechanical Engineers
- Badge of the 1st Close Support Battalion
- Active: 1993–Present; 33 years
- Country: United Kingdom of Great Britain and Northern Ireland
- Branch: British Army
- Type: Combat Service Support unit
- Size: Battalion; 278 Personnel
- Part of: 102 Operational Sustainment Brigade
- Garrison/HQ: Catterick Garrison
- Engagements: Op Telic; Op Herrick

1st Close Support Battalion, REME is a Combat service support unit of the British Army's Corps of Royal Electrical and Mechanical Engineers.

== Background ==
Following the end of the Cold War, a massive reorganisation of the Armed Forces took place, known as the Options for Change. Under this paper, new 'REME battalions' were to be formed by grouping previously independent REME workshops and companies within the two deployable divisions. At first all independent REME units would be grouped into these battalions, but this was later reduced to just three based in Germany.

== Formation ==
In September 1993, 1st Battalion REME was formed through the grouping of the following independent units: 12 Armoured Workshop HQ, 4 Close Support Company, and 12 General Support Company. The battalion was based at Mercer Barracks, Osnabrück Garrison.

The new battalion's role was to provide second line equipment support to the 1st (United Kingdom) Armoured Division, in addition to supporting 4th Armoured Brigade, based in Osnabrück.

From May to October 2005 the battalion deployed for the first time, to Iraq on Operation Telic VI as part of the 'National Support Element'. From October 2007 to April 2008 it again deployed, this time to Afghanistan on Operation Herrick VI. Shortly after returning, the battalion was redesignated as part of the 2003 Defence White Paper (Note: Also known as 'Future Army Structure reform') to become 1st Close Support Battalion REME. As part of this reform, one brigade, 4th Armoured Brigade, was selected to move to Catterick Garrison in 2008, and the battalion followed, settling at Megiddo Lines, where they remain today.

== Army 2020 ==
Under the Army 2020 programme announced in 2010, the battalion would leave the operational command of the 1st (United Kingdom) Armoured Division and re-subordinate to 102nd Logistic Brigade. 1 Battalion REME would now work alongside 2 Btn REME to provide maintenance and technical support to the, now renamed, 1st (United Kingdom) Division. Under the reform, the battalion was paired, for the first time with a reserve unit, 102 Battalion based in Newton Aycliffe.

The battalion's last deployment would be from November 2012 to April 2013 on Operation Herrick VII. In mid 2013 the battalion along with the Heavy Cavalry and Cambrai Band marched through Richmond, North Yorkshire on their return from their last deployment to Afghanistan.

== Army 2020 Refine ==
Under the Army 2020 Refine announced in 2015, the battalion's role was again changed, now tasked with supporting what will become known as the 1st Strike Brigade. In preparation for this, the battalion is due to leave 102nd Logistic Brigade and transfer to 101 Logistic Brigade. By 2025 the battalion will either amalgamate or group with 1 Regiment RLC to provide a 'combined logistic support capability to the Strike Brigade'. 102 Logistic Brigade was due to be disbanded by 2017, however as of March 2021 this still hasn't occurred, with the battalion still under command of this brigade. (Note: Following the Army 2020 Refine, a new 'Echelon Company' was formed, following the announcement that the battalion would increase in size by 76 personnel. (Watling & Bronk, p. 16.) (Information on the Army 2020 refine exercise))

On 26 June 2015 the battalion was awarded the Freedom of Stockton, where they were supported by members of their paired battalion 102 Battalion REME (Volunteers). This was followed by the Freedom of Richmond, granted 3 years later on 27 April 2018, this time supported by the Band of the Royal Armoured Corps.

== Future Soldier ==
Under the Future Soldier reforms, the battalion re-subordinated to the 7th Light Mechanised Brigade Combat Team in April 2022. It has since re-subordinated to 102 Operational Sustainment Brigade.

== Organisation ==
As of March 2021, the battalion is based at Megiddo Lines, Catterick Garrison, where it will remain for the foreseeable future.

1 Close Support Battalion REME is composed of the following sub-units:

- Battalion Headquarters
- Headquarters Company
- 4 Close Support Company
- 12 Close Support Company
- Echelon Company
