= Nevill Smyth =

Recipient of the Victoria Cross

Major-General Sir Nevill Smyth VC KCB
- Born: 14 August 1868; Westminster, London
- Died: 21 July 1941 (aged 72); Balmoral, Victoria
- Burial place: Balmoral Cemetery
- Relatives: Dacre Smyth (son); Warington Wilkinson Smyth (father); William Smyth (grandfather); Robert Baden-Powell (cousin)
- Military career
- Allegiance: United Kingdom
- Branch: British Army
- Service years: 1888–1924
- Rank: Major-General
- Nickname: The Sphinx
- Units: 2nd Dragoon Guards (Queen's Bays); Carabiniers (6th Dragoon Guards)
- Commands: 47th (1/2nd London) Division (1919–1924); 59th (2nd North Midland) Division (1918); 58th (2/1st London) Division (1918); 2nd Australian Division (1916–1918); 1st Australian Brigade (1915–1916); Carabiniers (6th Dragoon Guards) (1909–1913)
- Conflicts: Mahdist War; Second Boer War; First World War
- Awards: Victoria Cross; Knight Commander of the Order of the Bath; Mentioned in Despatches (11); Order of the Medjidieh, Fourth Class (Egypt); Order of Osmanieh, Fourth Class (Egypt); Croix de Guerre (Belgium); Officer of the Legion of Honour (France)
- Other work: National Party of Australia politician

Major-General Sir Nevill Maskelyne Smyth, VC, KCB (14 August 1868 – 21 July 1941) was a senior officer in the British Army and a recipient of the Victoria Cross, the highest award for gallantry in the face of the enemy that can be awarded to British and Commonwealth forces.

== Early life ==
Born the son of Warington Wilkinson Smyth, a noted geologist, his grandfather was Admiral William Henry Smyth. His father's sister, Henrietta Grace Powell, was Robert Baden-Powell's mother, making Baden-Powell, the founder of the Scout Movement, Smyth's first cousin.

Smyth was educated at Westminster School and graduated from the Royal Military College, Sandhurst, in 1888. He was posted to the Queen's Bays (2nd Dragoon Guards) in India as a second lieutenant on 22 August 1888. In 1890 he was attached to the Royal Engineers to assist with a railway survey during the Zhob Valley expedition.

== Sudan ==
In 1895 Smyth was stationed in Cairo with his regiment, being promoted lieutenant on 26 April of that year. From December 1895 until March 1896 he was attached to Theodore Bent’s explorations in the Northern Sudan, being “kindly attached to our expedition by Colonel Sir F. Wingate…” For his services in the initial stages of the Mahdist War he was mentioned in despatches on 3 November 1896, and awarded the Order of the Medjidieh, Fourth Class in 1897.

Smyth was promoted captain on 8 December 1897. On 2 September came the Battle of Omdurman. Near to the end of the battle, a dervish tried to spear two war correspondents; Smyth galloped forward and, though severely speared through the arm, shot the man dead. This action saw him awarded the Victoria Cross. The citation was gazetted on 15 November 1898, and read:

War Office, November 15, 1898.

THE Queen has been graciously pleased to signify Her intention to confer the decoration of the Victoria Cross on the undermentioned Officers and Private Soldier, whose claims have been submitted for Her Majesty's approval, for their conspicuous bravery during the recent operations in the Soudan, [sic] as recorded against their names:—

[...]

2nd Dragoon Guards, Captain Nevill Maskelyne Smyth

At the Battle of Khartum on 2 September 1898, Captain Smyth galloped forward and attacked an arab who had run amok among some camp followers. Captain Smyth received the Arab's charge, and killed him, being wounded with a spear in the arm whilst in so doing. He thus saved the life of at least one of the Camp Followers.

Smyth was also Mentioned in Despatches. In November 1899 he was Intelligence officer and aide-de-camp to Colonel Lewis, commanding the Infantry Brigade during the operations leading to the defeat of the Khalifa in the Battle of Umm Diwaykarat. He was Mentioned in Despatches, and was awarded the Order of Osmanieh, Fourth Class in 1900.

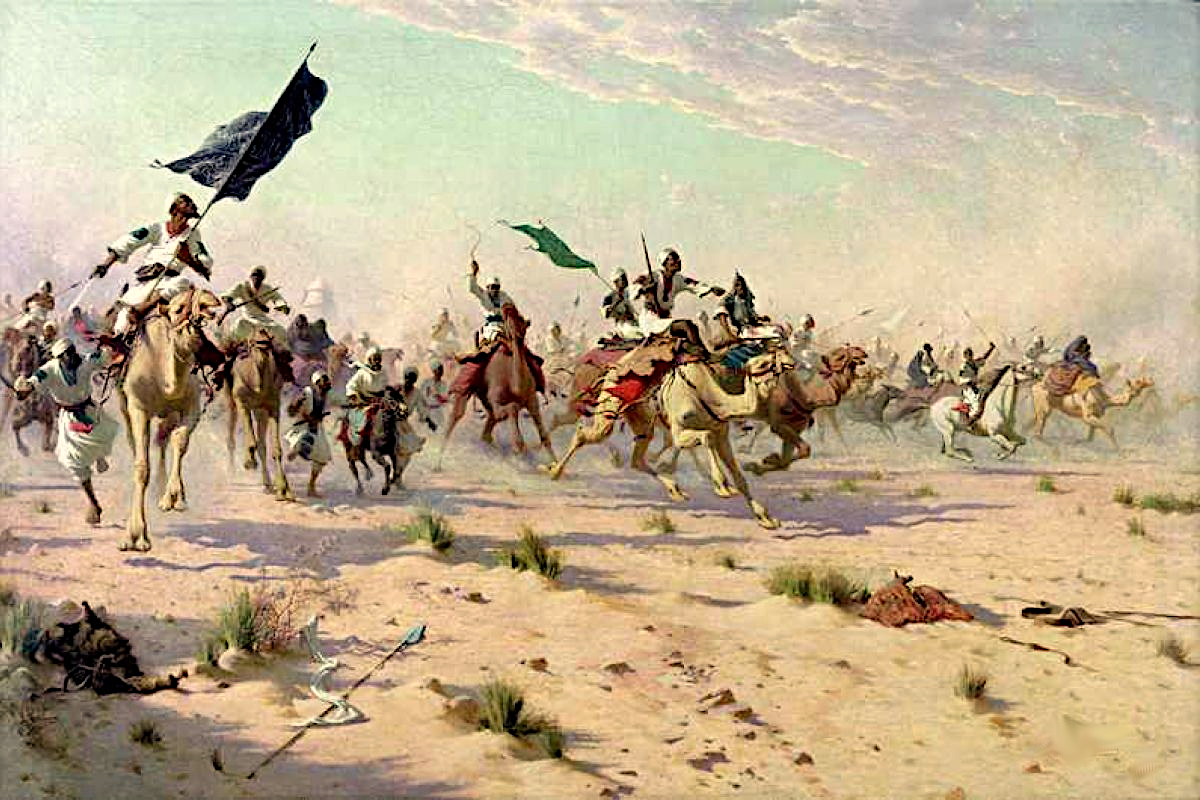
The Mahdi's followers at Omdurman

Smyth rejoined the Queens Bays for active service in South Africa in the Second Boer War. He was awarded a brevet majority on 22 August 1902 for his South African service. Smyth was promoted to substantive major on 27 October 1903 when he transferred to the Carabiniers (6th Dragoon Guards), who were then in India, and returned to South Africa in 1908. He was promoted lieutenant colonel on 1 May 1909, and succeeded Henry Peregrine Leader as commanding officer (CO) of the Carabiniers. The regiment returned to England in 1912. According to the London Gazette, he completed the standard four-year period as a regimental commander on 1 May 1909, and was placed on half-pay. However, the same issue carried notice of his promotion to colonel, backdated to 4 December 1912. He was seconded to the Egyptian Army, and in 1913–14 he was commandant of the Khartoum district where he was active in combating the slave trade.

== First World War ==
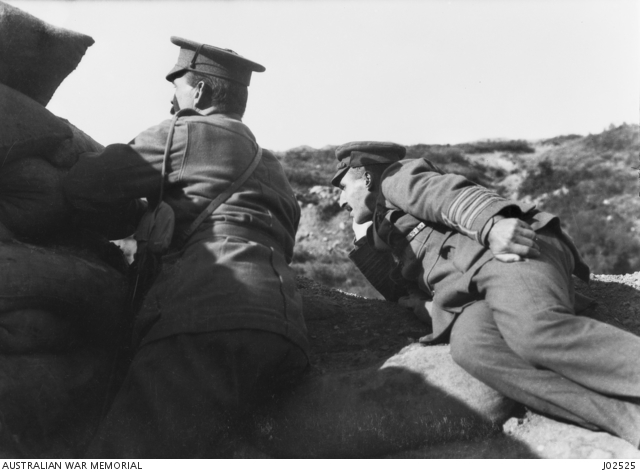
Brigadier General Smyth and his brigade major, Major Walter Cass, looking down Allah Gully towards Gaba Tepe, Gallipoli, 1915.

Smyth was dispatched to Gallipoli by Lord Kitchener, arriving there in May 1915. Promoted to the temporary rank of brigadier general that same month, he took command of the 1st Australian Infantry Brigade after its previous commander, Brigadier General Henry Normand MacLaurin, had been killed. He led the brigade during the Gallipoli campaign at the Battle of Lone Pine and was one of the last officers to leave the peninsula during the evacuation from Gallipoli in late 1915. He was appointed a Companion of the Order of the Bath on 1 January 1916, and received a further mention in despatches on 28 January 1916.

Smyth led the brigade in action on the Western Front later in 1916, and on 28 December was given command of the 2nd Australian Division, for which he was made a temporary major general. He was mentioned in despatches twice more, on 15 May 1917 and 11 December 1917, and was promoted substantive major general on 1 January 1918 as a "reward for distinguished service in the field."

He was transferred back to the British Army in May 1918 and briefly commanded the 58th (2/1st London) Division and then the 59th (2nd North Midland) Division from August 1918, leading the latter during the liberation of Lille in October 1918, shortly before the Armistice of 11 November 1918.

He had learned to fly in 1913 and was known for borrowing aircraft to look at the lines for himself. He was yet again mentioned in despatches on 20 December 1918, by which time the war was over due to the Armistice.

== Post-war and final years ==
Smyth was appointed a Knight Commander of the Order of the Bath in the 1919 Birthday Honours. On 30 July 1919 was appointed GOC 47th (1/2nd London) Division (Territorial Force). During the war he had also been awarded the Belgian Croix de Guerre, and the French Legion of Honour in the grade of Officer. In all, he was Mentioned in Despatches eleven times during his career. He was appointed colonel of the 3rd Dragoon Guards on 1 October 1920. He relinquished command of his division on 30 July 1923. Smyth retired from the British Army on 5 July 1924, and relinquished the colonelcy of the 3rd Dragoon Guards on 16 October 1925.

Smyth served as the Honorary Colonel of the South African Natal Carbineers from 1920 to 1925 and then of the 37/39th Australian Infantry Battalion.

In London in July 1918, Smyth married Evelyn Olwen Williams, daughter of Colonel Sir Osmond Williams, baronet and lord lieutenant of Merionethshire. Their three children were born in Britain before the family migrated to Australia.

== Australia ==
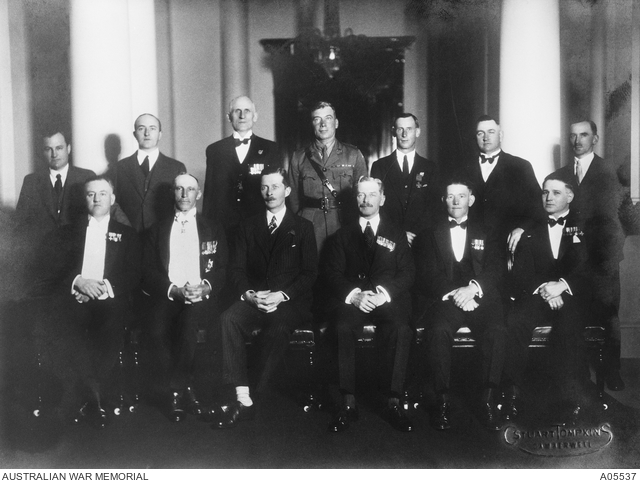
Formal group photograph taken at a Victoria Cross Reunion Dinner, sometime in the 1920s. Seated, second on the left, is Sir Nevill Smyth.

After his retirement, Smyth and his family migrated to Australia in 1925 to live on a farm at Balmoral, Victoria. He took to politics in the Nationalist Party of Australia and stood unsuccessfully for a Victorian casual vacancy in the Australian Senate. He died at home in 1941 and was buried in Balmoral Cemetery.

One of his sons, Dacre Smyth, followed a military career in the Royal Australian Navy, rising to the rank of commodore.

Military offices
Preceded by Albemarle Cator	GOC 58th (2/1st London) Division; May – June 1918	Succeeded by Frank Ramsay
Preceded by Robert Whigham	GOC 59th (2nd North Midland) Division; 1918 – 1919	Succeeded by Charles Budworth
Preceded by Sir George Gorringe	GOC 47th (1/2nd London) Division; 1919 – 1923	Succeeded by Sir William Thwaites
Honorary titles
Preceded by Sir Reginald Talbot	Colonel of the 3rd Dragoon Guards; 1920 – 1922	Regiments consolidated
New command Formed from 3rd Dragoon Guards and 6th Dragoon Guards	Colonel of the 3rd/6th Dragoon Guards; 1920 – 1925	Succeeded by Sir William Robertson
