= George Calvert Clarke =

General George Calvert Clarke CB
- Born: 23 July 1814
- Died: 9 February 1900 (aged 85); Church-house, Uckfield
- Military career
- Allegiance: United Kingdom
- Branch: British Army
- Service years: 1834–1881
- Rank: General
- Units: 2nd (Royal North British) Regiment of Dragoons (Royal Scots Greys); 6th Dragoon Guards (The Carabiniers)
- Commands: Regimental Colonel of 6th Dragoon Guards (1880); Regimental Colonel of 2nd Dragoons (Royal Scots Greys)
- Conflicts: Crimean War: Siege of Sevastopol; Balaclava; Inkerman; Tchernaïa
- Awards: Legion d'Honneur (France)

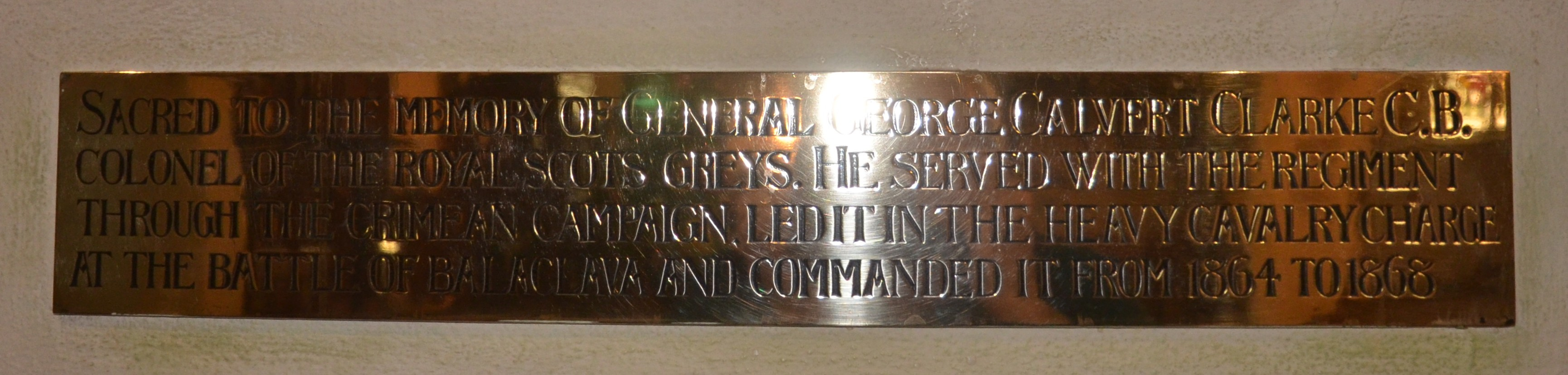
Monument to George Calvert Clarke in Holy Cross Church, Uckfield, East Sussex

General George Calvert Clarke, CB (23 July 1814 – 9 February 1900), was a British Army officer who served in the Crimean War.

== Biography ==
Clarke was born in 1814 and commissioned a cornet in the 2nd (Royal North British) Regiment of Dragoons (later Royal Scots Greys) on 30 May 1834. He was promoted to lieutenant on 7 October 1836, to captain on 20 September 1839, and received a brevet promotion to major in November 1851.

He served with his regiment in the Crimean War (1853-1856), where he took part in the Siege of Sevastopol (1854–55), including the battles of Balaclava (25 October 1854), Inkerman (5 November 1854), and Tchernaïa (16 August 1855). He was promoted to brevet lieutenant-colonel in December 1854 for his part in the campaign and received the French Legion d'Honneur. Promotion to the substantive rank of major followed on 26 February 1858, to the rank of colonel on 23 April 1860, to the rank of major-general on 6 March 1868, to the rank of lieutenant-general on 1 October 1877, and to the rank of general on 1 July 1881, the same year he retired from active service.

He was appointed Regimental Colonel of the 6th Dragoon Guards (The Carabiniers) on 4 October 1880 but changed back to his old regiment as Regimental Colonel of the 2nd Dragoons (Royal Scots Greys) in 1891.

He was appointed a Companion of the Order of the Bath (CB) in 1873.

Clarke died at Church-house, Uckfield, on 9 February 1900.

Military offices
Preceded by	Colonel of the 6th Dragoon Guards (The Carabiniers); 1880–1891	Succeeded by Sir Alexander Elliot
Preceded by Sir John Bloomfield Gough	Colonel of the Royal Scots Greys; 1891–1900	Succeeded by Andrew Nugent
