= John Fryer (British Army officer) =

British Army officer

Lieutenant-General Sir John Fryer, KCB (27 June 1838 – 28 January 1917) was a British Army officer.

Fryer was born at Wimborne Minster, Dorset, the eldest son of John Fryer and Mary Rogers Fryer.

After studying at Exeter College, Oxford, he entered the Army in 1860 as a cornet in The Carabiniers (6th Dragoon Guards). He was promoted to the rank of lieutenant on 18 February 1862, captain on 5 April 1864, major on 15 December 1869, and lieutenant-colonel on 17 March 1877. As such he commanded the regiment from 1877 to 1882, during which he was promoted to the rank of colonel on 1 July 1881. His period of command included the regiment's operations in Afghanistan during the Second Anglo-Afghan War, for which he was appointed a Companion of the Order of the Bath (CB). After stepping down from his command, he was further promoted to major-general on 23 July 1890, and lieutenant-general on 14 December 1898.

He was appointed to the honorary position as Colonel of the 6th Dragoon Guards on 18 September 1902, serving as such until his death in 1917. He was advanced to a Knight Commander in the Order of the Bath (KCB) in 1903.

Military offices
Preceded by Sir Alexander Elliot	Colonel of the 6th Dragoon Guards (The Carabiniers); 1902–1917	Succeeded by Henry Peregrine Leader
