= Ralph Younger =

British army officer

Major-General Ralph Younger CB CBE DSO MC DL
- Born: 12 July 1904
- Died: 2 August 1985 (aged 81)
- Military career
- Allegiance: United Kingdom
- Branch: British Army
- Service years: 1925–1958
- Rank: Major-General
- Service number: 33496
- Unit: 7th Queen's Own Hussars
- Commands: 3rd Carabiniers; 30th Independent Armoured Brigade; 7th Armoured Brigade; 49th (West Riding) Armoured Division
- Conflicts: Second World War
- Awards: Companion of the Order of the Bath; Commander of the Order of the British Empire; Distinguished Service Order; Military Cross

Major-General Ralph Younger, CB, CBE, DSO, MC, DL (12 July 1904 – 2 August 1985) was a British Army officer.

== Military career ==
Younger was commissioned into the 7th Queen's Own Hussars in 1925. He served as commanding officer of the 3rd Carabiniers in Burma in 1944 during the Second World War.

Younger was appointed second in command of the 255th Indian Tank Brigade in August 1944, then promoted to command the brigade in May 1945, commanding it until November.

After the war he became commander of 30th Independent Armoured Brigade in March 1949, commander of 7th Armoured Brigade in December 1950 and Commandant of the Royal Armoured Corps Centre at Bovington Camp in November 1953. His last appointment was as General Officer Commanding 49th (West Riding) Armoured Division in December 1954 before retiring in March 1958.

He was colonel of the 7th Queen's Own Hussars from 1952 to 1958 of the Queen's Own Hussars from 1958 to 1962 and of the Royal Scots Dragoon Guards from 1971 to 1975.

== Family ==
In 1932 he married Mary Cynthia Mills; after they divorced he married Greta Mary Turnbull in 1938; they had a son and a daughter.

Military offices
Preceded by Reginald Harding	GOC 49th (West Riding) Armoured Division; 1954–1957	Succeeded by Richard Goodwin
