= Royal Scots Dragoon Guards Museum =

The Royal Scots Dragoon Guards (Carabiniers and Greys) Regimental Museum
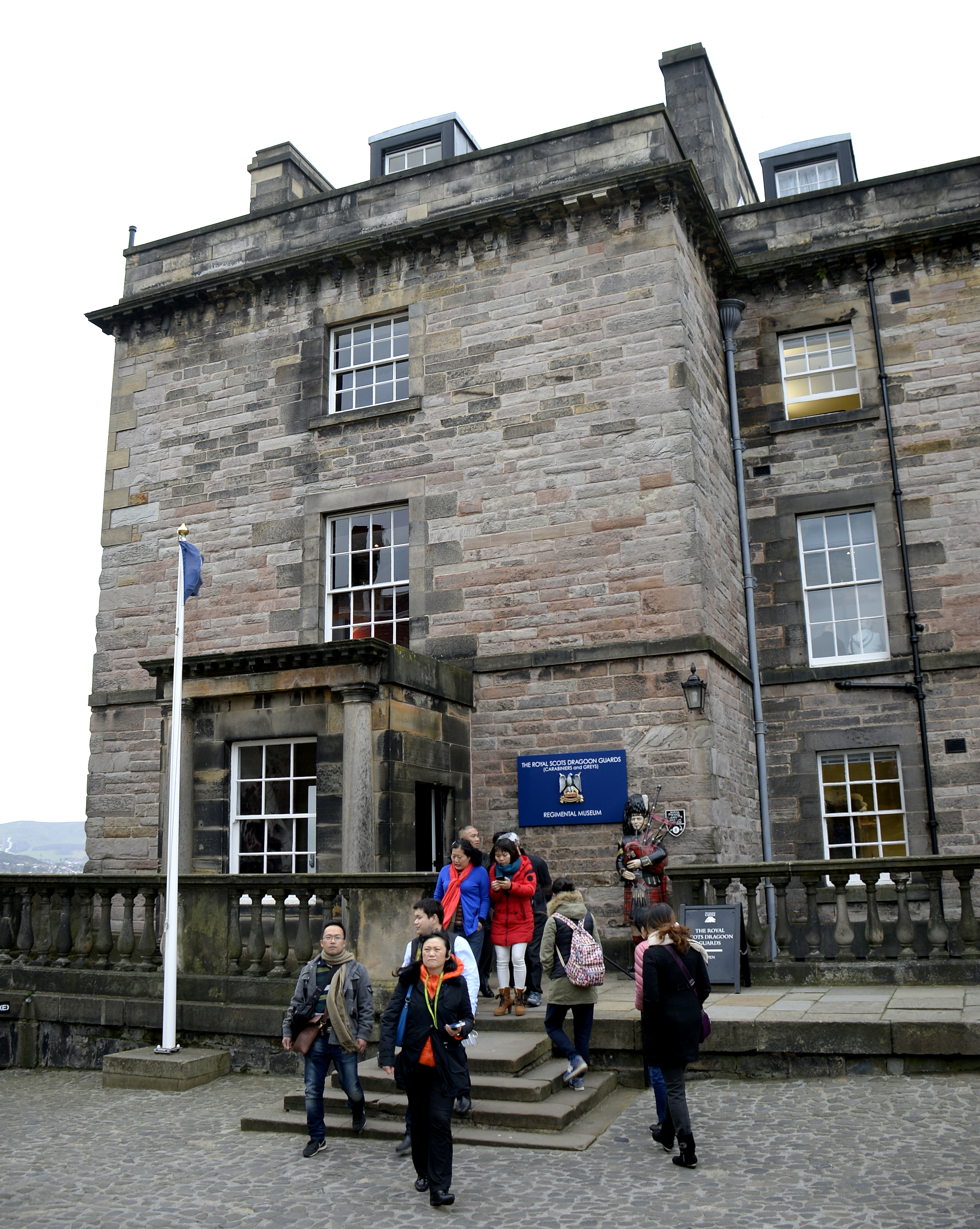
- Royal Scots Dragoon Guards Museum

- Location within Edinburgh
- Established: 1995
- Location: Edinburgh Castle
- Coordinates: 55.94913°N 3.20014°W
- Website: www.royalarmouredcorps.org.uk/museums/sdg-museum/

The Royal Scots Dragoon Guards Museum is a regimental museum displaying the collections of the Royal Scots Dragoon Guards and its predecessor regiments. It is based in the New Barracks (built between 1796 and 1799) at Edinburgh Castle in Scotland.

== History ==
The museum brings together the collections of the 3rd Carabiniers (Prince of Wales's Dragoon Guards) (themselves the product of the amalgamation in 1922 of 3rd Dragoon Guards (Prince of Wales's) and 6th Dragoon Guards (Carabiniers)), and The Royal Scots Greys (2nd Dragoons). The museum, which was originally located in the basement of the New Barracks, was opened by the Queen in 1995. It moved above ground in the New Barracks in 2006 and was officially re-opened by the Queen on 7 July 2006.

== Collections ==
The exhibits include uniforms, medals, weapons, regalia and music of the Royal Scots Dragoon Guards. A highlight of the museum is the French Imperial Eagle that was captured by Sergeant Charles Ewart of the Royal Scots Greys from the French 45th Régiment d'Infanterie de Ligne at the Battle of Waterloo in June 1815. It also includes military and personal memorabilia loaned by the explorer Sir Ranulph Fiennes, who served with the regiment, and the Victoria Cross awarded to Sergeant Henry Ramage of the Royal Scots Greys during the Crimean War.

The gift shop sells the music of the Pipes and Drums, including "Amazing Grace", which reached number one in the charts in the United Kingdom, Ireland, Australia, New Zealand, Canada and South Africa in 1972.

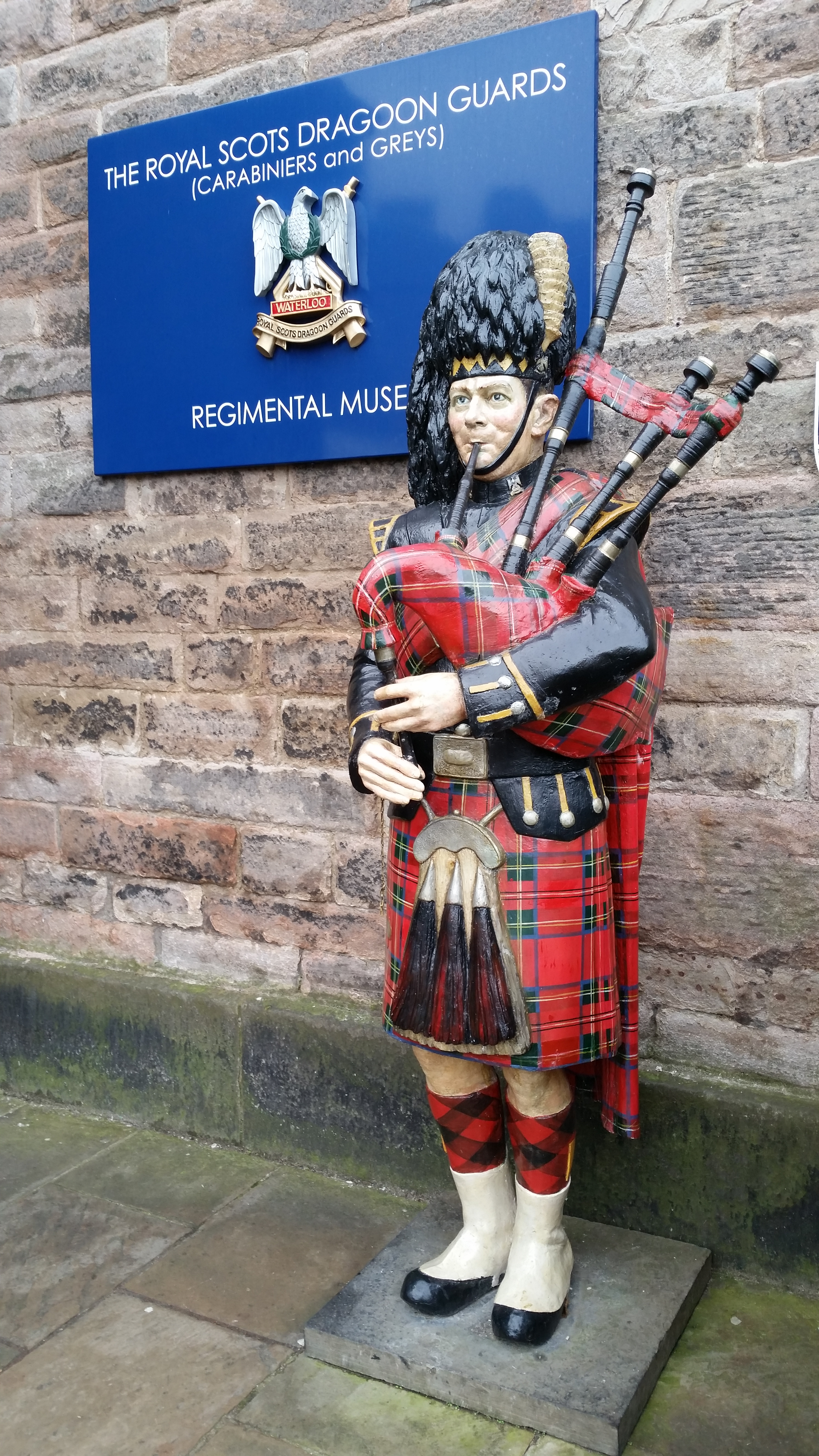
Statue of a piper outside the museum

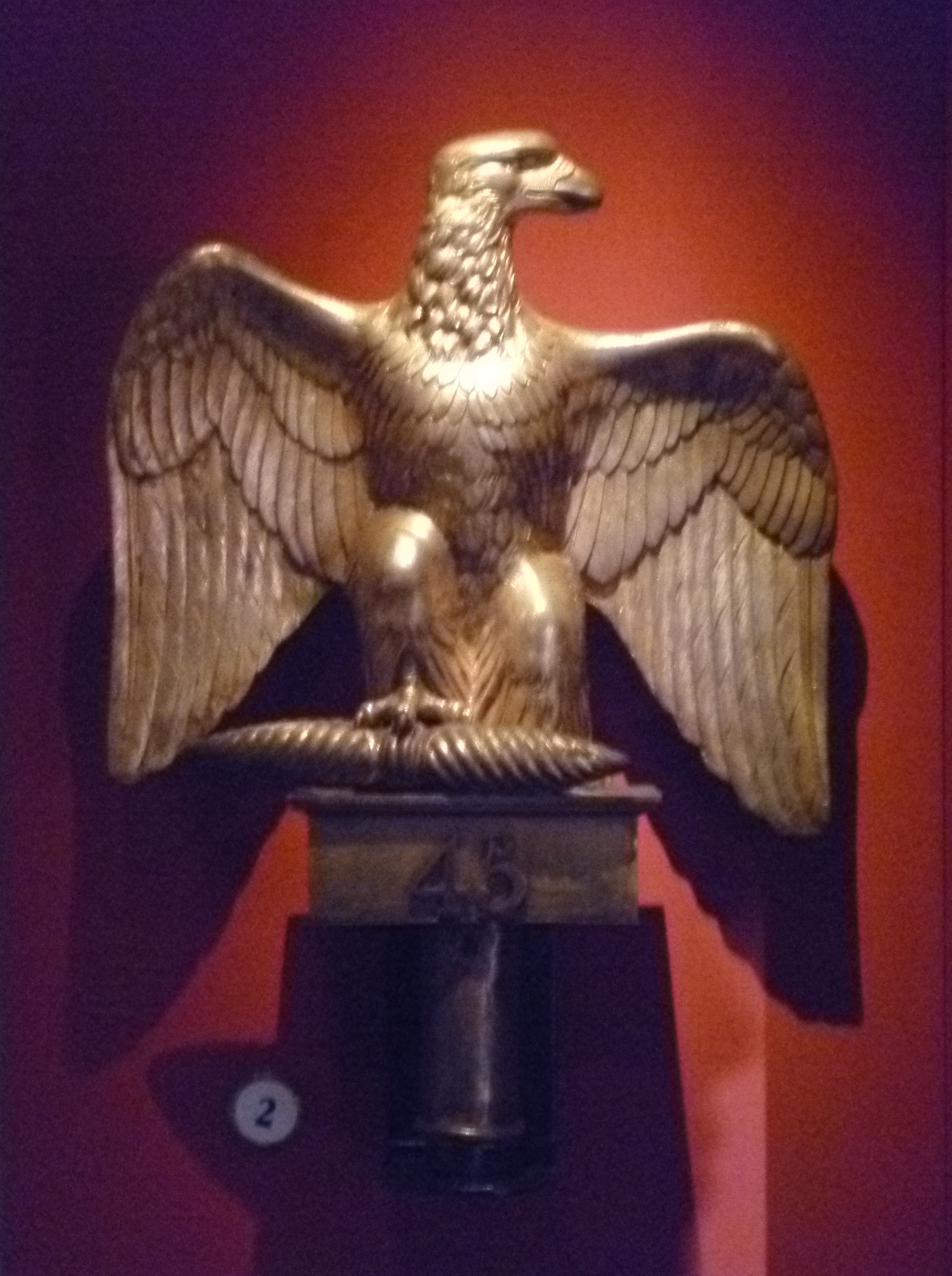
The Eagle captured by Charles Ewart at Waterloo in June 1815

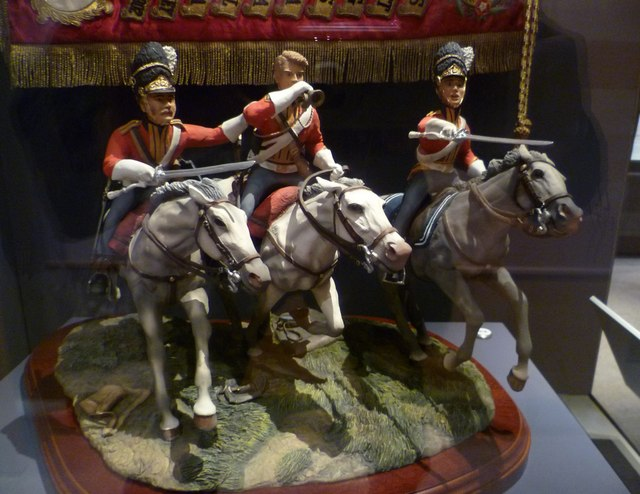
Model of the charge of the Royal Scots Greys at Waterloo in June 1815

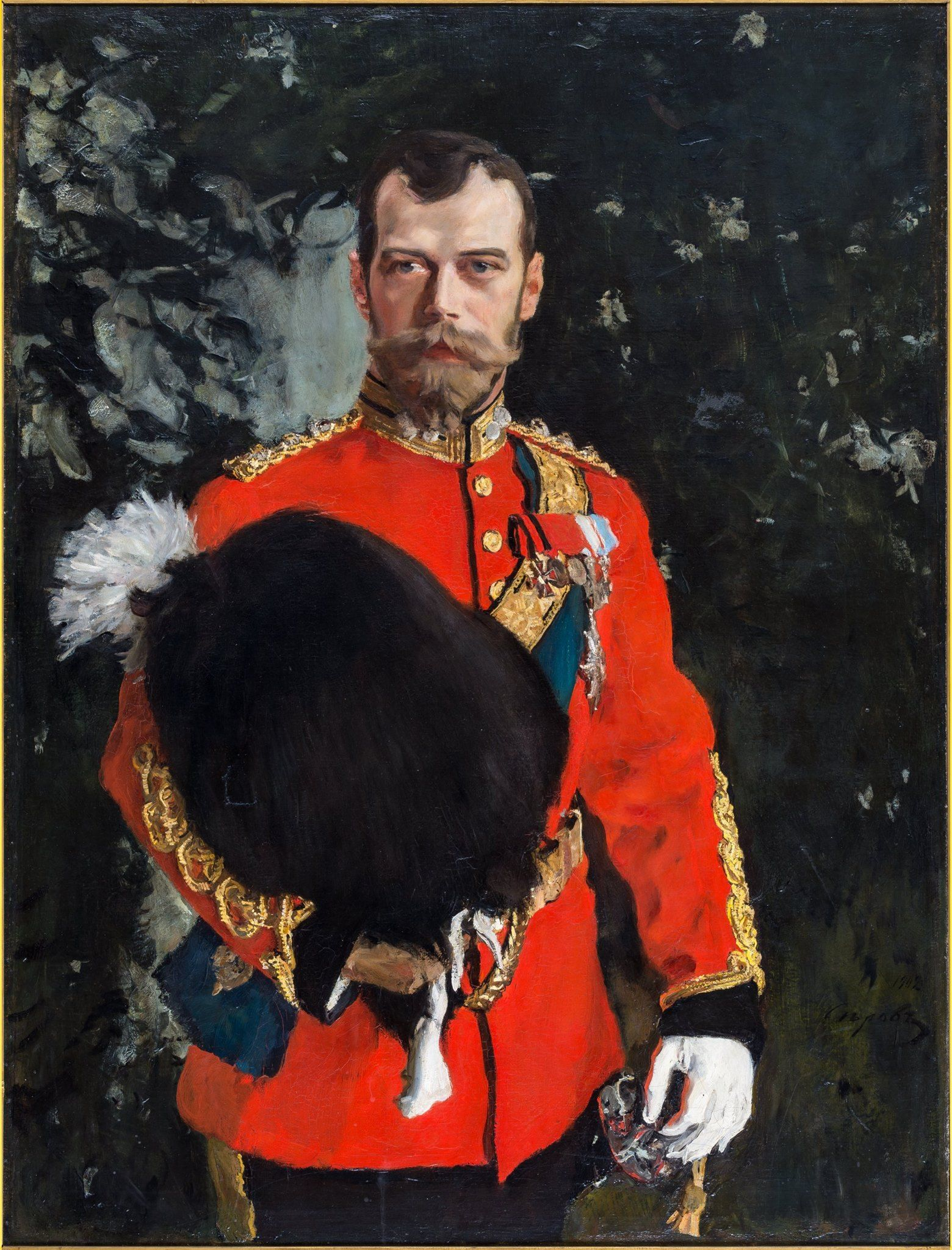
Painting of Tsar Nicholas II of Russia, Colonel-in-Chief of the Royal Scots Greys, by Valentin Serov, 1902

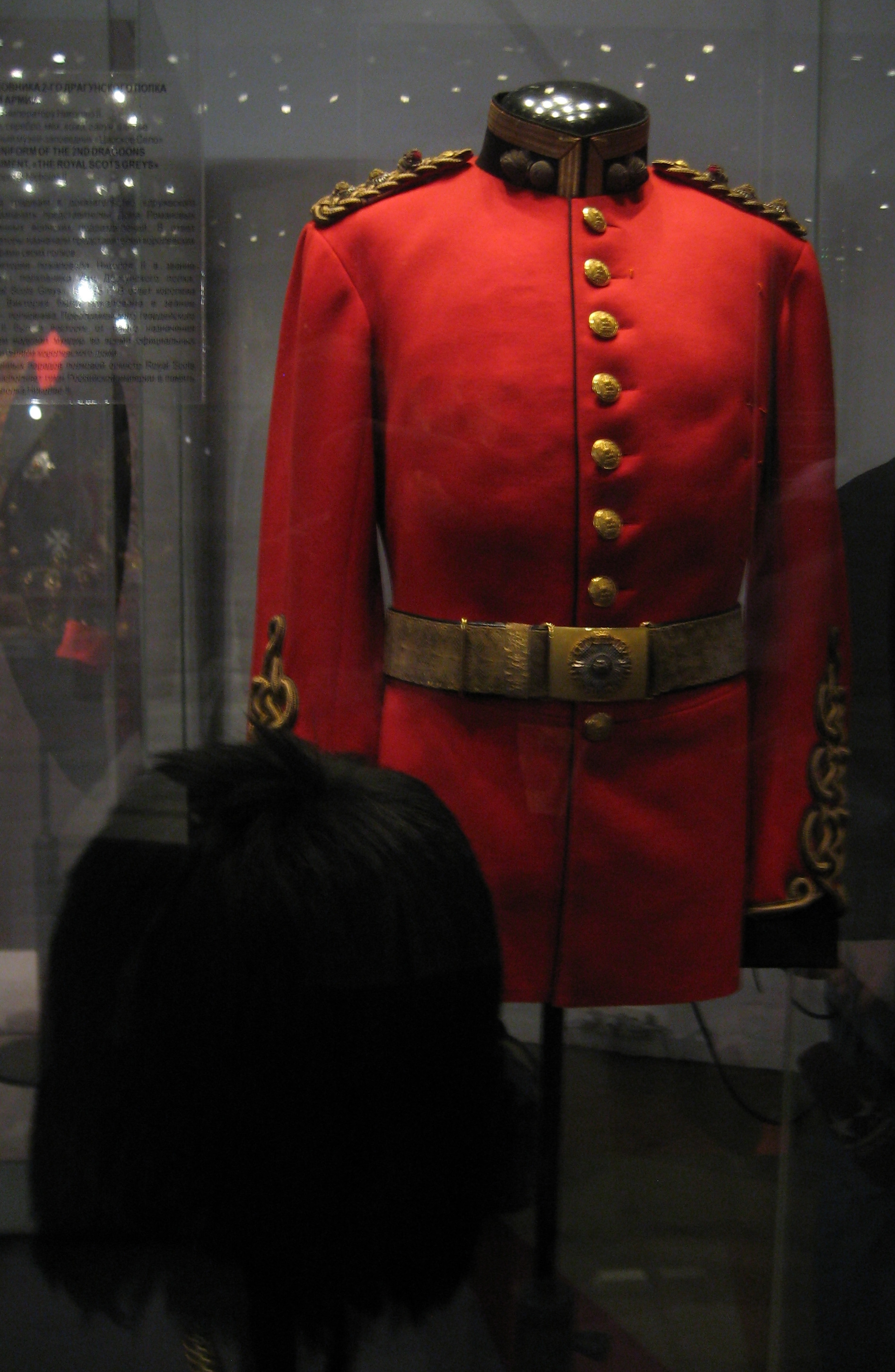
Tsar Nicholas II of Russia's uniform
