= Henry Ramage =

Recipient of the Victoria Cross

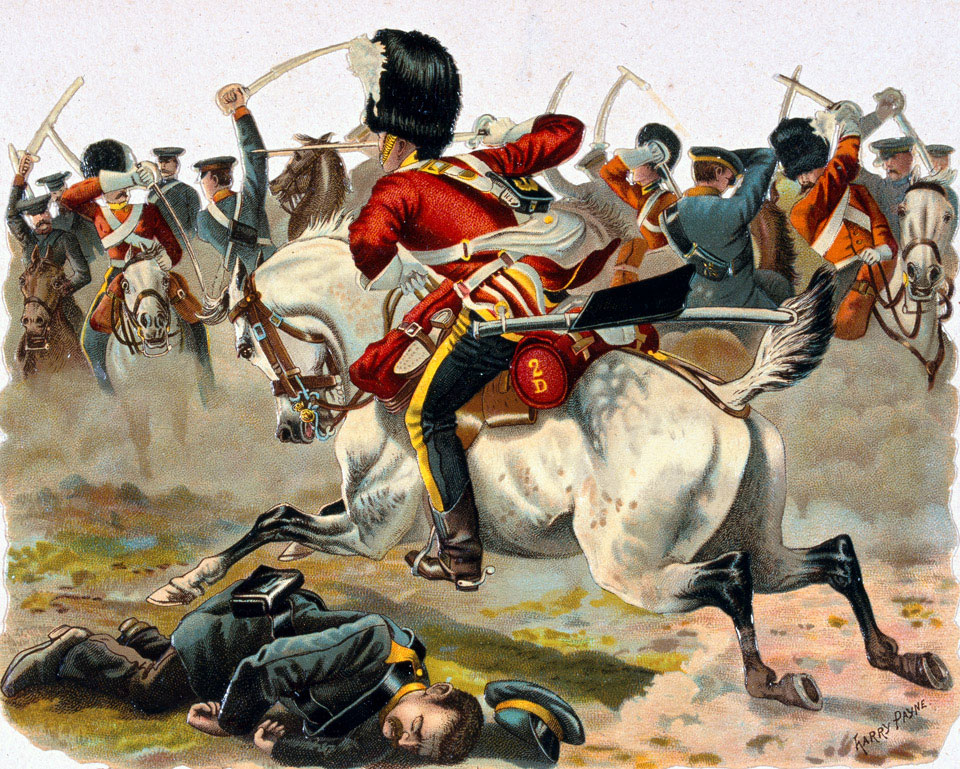
- Ramage during his Victoria Cross action
- Born: 1827; Morningside, Edinburgh
- Died: 29 December 1859 (aged 32); Newbridge, County Kildare
- Burial place: Newbridge Cemetery
- Military career
- Allegiance: United Kingdom
- Branch: British Army
- Rank: Sergeant
- Units: 2nd Dragoons (Royal Scots Greys)
- Conflicts: Crimean War
- Awards: Victoria Cross

Henry Ramage VC (1827 – 29 December 1859) was a Scottish recipient of the Victoria Cross, the highest and most prestigious award for gallantry in the face of the enemy that can be awarded to British and Commonwealth forces.

== Details ==
Ramage was about 27 years old, and a sergeant in the 2nd Dragoons (Royal Scots Greys), British Army during the Crimean War when the following deed took place for which he was awarded the VC.

On 25 October 1854 at Balaclava, Crimea, Sergeant Ramage galloped out to the assistance of a private who was surrounded by seven Russians. The sergeant dispersed them and saved his comrade's life. On the same day, he brought in a prisoner from the Russian line and also, when the Heavy Brigade was covering the retreat of the Light Cavalry, lifted from his horse a private who was badly wounded and carried him safely to the rear under heavy cross-fire.

He was born in Morningside, Edinburgh in 1827. He died in Newbridge, County Kildare, Ireland on 29 December 1859 aged 32.

== Medal ==
His Victoria Cross is displayed at the Royal Scots Dragoon Guards Museum at Edinburgh Castle in Edinburgh, Scotland.
