= Dacre Smyth =

Dacre Henry Deudraeth Smyth
- Born: 5 May 1923; London, England
- Died: 3 December 2008 (aged 85); Toorak, Victoria, Australia
- Relatives: Major General Sir Nevill Smyth (father)
- Military career
- Allegiance: Australia
- Branch: Royal Australian Navy
- Service years: 1940–1978
- Rank: Commodore
- Commands: HMAS Supply
- Conflicts: Second World War; Battle of the Coral Sea; Normandy landings; Korean War; Vietnam War
- Awards: Officer of the Order of Australia; Legion of Honour (France)

Commodore Dacre Henry Deudraeth Smyth, AO (5 May 1923 – 3 December 2008) was a senior officer in the Royal Australian Navy (RAN), an artist and a poet. He joined the RAN in 1940, and participated in the D-Day landings and the Battle of the Coral Sea before retiring as a commodore in 1978.

He was the son of the distinguished British general Nevill Maskelyne Smyth. His mother was Evelyn Olwen (1884–1960), daughter of Sir Osmond Williams, 1st Baronet (1849–1927) of Castell Deudraeth, Penrhyndeudraeth, Merioneth, Wales. and his wife Frances Evelyn (1855–1926), daughter of John Whitehead Greaves.

He served as Deputy Chairman of the Trustees of Melbourne's Shrine of Remembrance and was a Life Governor of the Shrine. He became well known after his retirement for landscape and seascape painting, publishing fourteen books containing his paintings and poems. He married Jennifer Haggard in 1952, and had four daughters and a son.

== Works ==
1. Smyth, Dacre (1979) The bridges of the Yarra: A book of paintings, poetry and prose; with a foreword by Sir John Bloomfield.

2. Smyth, Dacre (1980) The lighthouses of Victoria: A second book of paintings, poetry and prose; with a foreword by Sam Benson.

3. Smyth, Dacre (1982) Historic ships of Australia: A third book of paintings, poetry, and prose; with a foreword by Admiral Lionel Lockwood.

4. Smyth, Dacre (1982) Old Riverboats of the Murray: A fourth book of paintings, poetry and prose.

5. Smyth, Dacre (1984) Views of Victoria in the steps of von Guérard: A fifth book of paintings, poetry and prose; with a foreword by Sir William Dargie.

6. Smyth, Dacre (1986) The Bridges of Kananook Creek: A sixth book of paintings, poetry and prose; with a foreword by Chester Nevett.

7. Smyth, Dacre (1988) Waterfalls of Victoria: A Seventh Book of Paintings, Poetry and Prose.

8. Smyth, Dacre (1990) Gallipoli Pilgrimage: An Eighth Book of Paintings, Poetry and Prose.

9. Smyth, Dacre (1992) Immigrant ships to Australia: A ninth book of paintings, poetry and prose; with a foreword by Marten A. Syme.

10. Smyth, Dacre (1994) Pictures in my life: an autobiography in oils: A tenth book of paintings, poetry, and prose.

11. Smyth, Dacre (1998) Images of Melbourne: (an A to Z of the Melbourne scene): An eleventh book of paintings, poetry and prose.

12. Smyth, Dacre (2001) Australia from the air: A twelfth book of paintings, poetry and prose

13. Smyth, Dacre (2003) Australia from the sea: A thirteenth book of paintings, poetry and prose.

14. Smyth, Dacre (2005) The Marquesas Islands of French Polynesia: A fourteenth book of paintings, poetry and prose.
