= Melville Jameson =

British Army officer (born 1944)

Brigadier Sir Melville Stewart Jameson, KCVO, CBE, CStJ (born 17 July 1944) is a British Army officer who was Lord Lieutenant of Perth and Kinross from 2006 to 2020. He was awarded the Freedom of the City of Perth on stepping down from the post.

Jameson was commissioned into the Royal Scots Greys in 1964, commanded the Royal Scots Dragoon Guards between 1986 and 1988, was promoted to colonel in 1990 and brigadier in 1994, and commanded the 51st Highland Brigade between 1993 and 1996. He was chief executive of the Royal Edinburgh Military Tattoo from 1995 to 2007.

In 1994, he was appointed a Commander of the Order of the British Empire, and in the 2018 Birthday Honours he was appointed a Knight Commander of the Royal Victorian Order.
