= Robert White (British Army officer) =

General Sir Robert White KCB
- Born: 21 February 1827
- Died: 17 September 1902 (aged 75); Aghavoe, Queen's County, Ireland
- Military career
- Allegiance: United Kingdom
- Branch: British Army
- Rank: General
- Commands: 22nd Brigade; Eastern District.
- Conflicts: Crimean War
- Awards: Knight Commander of the Order of the Bath

General Sir Robert White KCB (21 February 1827 – 17 September 1902) was a British Army officer who became General Officer Commanding Eastern District.

== Military career ==
White was commissioned into the 17th Light Dragoons on 15 October 1847, and was promoted to lieutenant the following year. Promoted to captain in 1852, he fought and was severely wounded at the Battle of Alma in September 1854 during the Crimean War. He was also badly wounded at the Battle of Balaclava in October 1854, when he had his horse shot under him. In 1857 he proceeded with his regiment to India, and served throughout the campaign in Central India 1858–1859, part of the time in command of a flying column. He was promoted to lieutenant-colonel in 1860, to colonel in 1865, and to major-general in 1870. He went on to be Commander of the 22nd Brigade, based at Norton Barracks in Worcestershire, in 1873 and General Officer Commanding Eastern District in September 1882. Promotion to lieutenant-general followed in 1885, and to general in 1890.

He was also Colonel of the 21st Hussars from 1886 until his death in 1902.

White died at Aghavoe, Queen's County, Ireland on 17 September 1902, after nearly a year's illness.

Honorary titles
Preceded by Sir Henry Clifford	GOC Eastern District; 1882–1886	Succeeded by Sir Evelyn Wood
Preceded by Sir Charles John Foster	Colonel of the 21st Regiment of Hussars/21st (Empress of India′s) Lancers; 1886–1902	Succeeded by Sir Alexander Elliot
