= 3rd Carabiniers =

3rd Carabiniers (Prince of Wales's Dragoon Guards)
- Badge of the 3rd Carabiniers
- Active: 1922–1971
- Country: United Kingdom
- Branch: British Army
- Type: Cavalry
- Motto: Ich Dien (I Serve)
- March: Quick: 6th Dragoon Guards; Slow: 3rd Dragoon Guards
- Engagements: Second World War: Burma campaign

The 3rd Carabiniers (Prince of Wales's Dragoon Guards) was a cavalry regiment of the British Army. It was formed in 1922 as part of a reduction in the army's cavalry by the amalgamation of the 3rd Dragoon Guards (Prince of Wales's) and the Carabiniers (6th Dragoon Guards), to form the 3rd/6th Dragoon Guards. It was renamed the 3rd Carabiniers (Prince of Wales's Dragoon Guards) in 1928 and amalgamated with the Royal Scots Greys (2nd Dragoons), forming the Royal Scots Dragoon Guards (Carabiniers and Greys) in 1971.

== History ==
=== Inter-war ===
The regiment was formed in 1922 as part of a reduction in the army's cavalry by the amalgamation of the 3rd Dragoon Guards (Prince of Wales's) and the Carabiniers (6th Dragoon Guards), to form the 3rd/6th Dragoon Guards. Both regiments were based in India at the time of their amalgamation; the newly formed regiment departed in 1925 for Britain. It regained its carabinier association in 1928, when it was renamed the 3rd Carabiniers (Prince of Wales's Dragoon Guards).

The 3rd Carabiniers was posted to Sialkot in India in 1936 and began its mechanisation process, changing its horses for armoured vehicles, in 1938.

=== Second World War ===
When the war began in September 1939, the 3rd Carabiniers was still based in India. In 1941, a cadre from the regiment was used to form the 25th Dragoons, which saw service in Burma; it was disbanded in India in 1947.

Now equipped with the M3 Lee medium tank, the regiment was sent to North-East India with the 254th Indian Tank Brigade in December 1943. It took part in the Battle of Imphal, which began in late March 1944 after the Japanese launched the U-Go offensive. On 20 March, around Tamu, six of the regiment's tanks clashed with six Japanese Type 95 Ha-Go tanks, destroying five of them and capturing the other. Later, in the battle to retake Nunshigum Ridge on 13 April, tanks from the regiment's 'B' Squadron supported the 1/17th Dogras in fierce fighting that dislodged the Japanese defenders.

The 3rd Carabiniers, operating usually at squadron level or lower, took part in the successful advance deep into occupied Burma, taking part in (among others) an intense action at Kennedy Peak. Early 1945 saw the regiment engaged in fighting at Shwebo and Sagang; it took part in the capture of Ava and Mandalay in March, and later around the Irrawaddy River.

=== Post-World War II ===
After the war's official end in September, the regiment was based at Ahmednagar in India up until the British withdrawal. The regiment's departure came in January 1947, when it embarked aboard the Highland Princess at Bombay.

The 3rd Carabiniers was posted to the British Army of the Rhine (BAOR) in West Germany in March 1952. The regiment was based in Osnabrück, remaining there until May 1959. After that, it moved to Catterick, England, but its stay there was short, as it joined the Strategic Reserve at Tidworth in July 1960. In July 1961, the regiment deployed its 'C' Squadron to Kuwait as part of a British force charged with deterring Iraq from fulfilling its threats to annex it. A return to West Germany came the following year, when it joined the 20th Armoured Brigade in Detmold.

Having been armed with tanks since the early 1950s, the regiment was re-roled to a reconnaissance unit in 1967, first operating the Ferret scout car. Deployments to the British military installations in Libya and Cyprus followed in 1968. A brief posting to Münster, West Germany took place in 1969 before moving to Herford, West Germany.

On 2 July 1971, the regiment amalgamated with the Royal Scots Greys (2nd Dragoons), forming the Royal Scots Dragoon Guards (Carabiniers and Greys).

== Regimental museum ==
The regimental collection is held in the Cheshire Military Museum at Chester Castle. Some items are also held by the Royal Scots Dragoon Guards Museum at Edinburgh Castle.

== Other information ==
- Anniversaries: Nunshigum (13 April)
- Alliances:
  - The Windsor Regiment (RCAC) — Canada (1951–1971)
  - Royal Natal Carbineers — South Africa (1922–1961)
- Associated Yeomanry:
  - The Cheshire Yeomanry (Earl of Chester's)
  - The East Riding Yeomanry

== Battle honours ==
The 3rd Carabiniers possessed a total of 62 battle honours, of which 49 were inherited from its predecessor units and were earned prior to the regiment's formation in 1922. During the Second World War, the amalgamated regiment received 13 battle honours.

The full list of battle honours held by the regiment are:

- Blenheim, Ramillies, Oudenarde, Malplaquet, Warburg, Beaumont, Willems, Talavera, Albuhera, Vittoria, Peninsula, Sevastopol, Delhi 1857, Abyssinia, Afghanistan 1879–80;
- Second Boer War: Relief of Kimberley, Paardeberg, South Africa 1899–1902;
- First World War: Retreat from Mons, Marne 1914, Aisne 1914, Messines 1914, Ypres 1914 '15, Arras 1917, Cambrai 1917 '18, Amiens, Hindenburg Line, France and Flanders 1914–18;
- Second World War: Imphal, Tamu Road, Nunshigum, Bishenpur, Kanglatongbi, Kennedy Peak, Shwebo, Sagaing, Mandalay, Ava, Irrawaddy River, Yenangyaung 1945, Burma 1944–45.

== Regimental Colonels ==
Colonels of the Regiment were:

3rd/6th Dragoon Guards

- 1922: Maj-Gen. Sir Nevill Maskelyne Smyth, VC, KCB
- 1922: Maj-Gen. Henry Peregrine Leader, CB
- 1925–1929: F.M. Sir William Robert Robertson, Bt, GCB, GCMG, GCVO, DSO

3rd Carabiniers (Prince of Wales's Dragoon Guards) (1928)

- 1929–1946: Gen. Sir George Alexander Weir, KCB, CMG, DSO
- 1946–1957: Brig. William Thomas Gill, MC
- 1957–1966: Brig. Joseph Russell Fishbourne, CBE
- 1966–1971: Brig. William Charles Walker Sloan, CBE
- 1971: Regiment amalgamated with The Royal Scots Greys (2nd Dragoons) to form the Royal Scots Dragoon Guards (Carabiniers and Greys)
