= Carabiniers (6th Dragoon Guards) =

British Army cavalry regiment

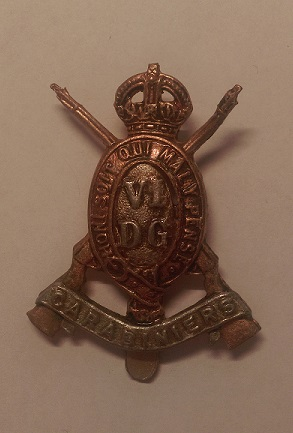
- Cap badge of the 6th Carabiniers
- Active: 1685–1922
- Country: Kingdom of England (1685–1707) Kingdom of Great Britain (1707–1746, 1788–1800); Kingdom of Ireland (1746–1788) United Kingdom (1801–1922)
- Branch: Army
- Type: Line Cavalry
- Role: Cavalry
- Size: One regiment
- Motto: "Honi Soit Qui Mal Y Pense" Anglo-Norman (Shame upon him who evil thinks)

Commanders
- Notable commanders: Henry Leader

The Carabiniers (6th Dragoon Guards) was a cavalry regiment of the British Army. It was formed in 1685 as the Lord Lumley's Regiment of Horse. It was renamed as His Majesty's 1st Regiment of Carabiniers in 1740, the 3rd Regiment of Horse (Carabiniers) in 1756 and the 6th Regiment of Dragoon Guards in 1788. After two centuries of service, including the First World War, the regiment was amalgamated with the 3rd Dragoon Guards (Prince of Wales's) to form the 3rd/6th Dragoon Guards in 1922.

== History ==
The regiment was raised during the reign of James II, by Richard Lumley, 1st Earl of Scarbrough, who recruited an independent troop of horse in response to the 1685 Monmouth Rebellion. It was subsequently used to create Lord Lumley's Regiment of Horse, and ranked as the 9th Regiment of Horse; the Queen Dowager then gave approval for Lumley to use the title The Queen Dowager's Horse.

Lumley was removed in early 1687 for refusing to admit Catholic officers, and replaced by the loyalist Sir John Talbot. Sir George Hewett took over after the 1688 Glorious Revolution, but died in 1689 during the Williamite War in Ireland, and was followed by Richard Beverley. In 1690, it became the 8th Regiment of Horse; transferred to Flanders for the Nine Years' War, it was renamed The King's Regiment of Carabineers in 1692. The regiment was ranked as the 7th Horse in 1694 and it fought at the Battle of Blenheim in August 1704 and the Battle of Ramillies in May 1706 during the War of the Spanish Succession.

A regimental private in 1742

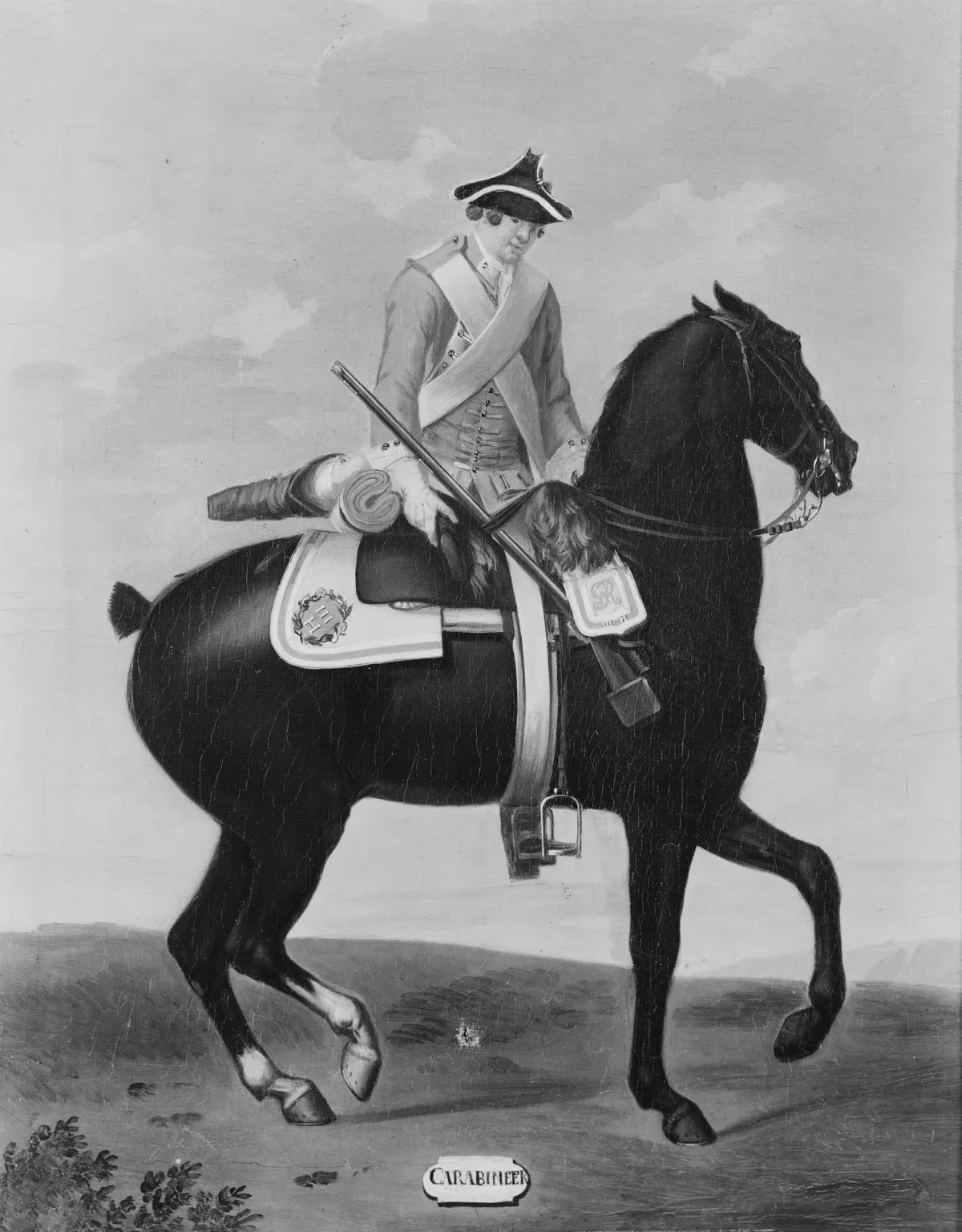
c. 1751 painting of a regimental private

The regiment was renamed the His Majesty's 1st Regiment of Carabiniers in 1740 and it took part in the response to the Jacobite rising in 1745. It was then transferred to the Irish establishment in 1746 and re-ranked as the 3rd Horse. It was next re-designated the 3rd Regiment of Horse (Carabiniers) in 1756 and then transferred back to the British establishment as the 6th Regiment of Dragoon Guards in 1788. It saw action in Flanders again in 1793 during the French Revolutionary Wars. It then became the 6th Regiment of Dragoon Guards (Carabineers) in 1826. It saw action at the Siege of Sevastopol during the Crimean War and was deployed to Afghanistan in the late 1870s during the Second Anglo-Afghan War.

Following the outbreak of the Second Boer War in South Africa, the regiment was sent there in November 1899. They took part in the relief of Kimberley in February 1900. After the war ended in June 1902, the Carabiniers was transferred to Bangalore, as part of the Madras command. 500 officers and men left Natal for India that August. In 1906, the regiment took part in the parade at the Grand Durbar (the visit of the Prince and Princess of Wales to Bangalore).

It landed in France at the outbreak of the First World War as part of the 4th Cavalry Brigade in the 1st Cavalry Division on 16 August 1914 for service on the Western Front. It took part in the Battle of Mons in August 1914, the First Battle of the Marne in September 1914, the First Battle of Ypres in October 1914 and the Second Battle of Ypres in April 1915 before going on to see further action at the Battle of the Somme in Autumn 1916, the Battle of Arras in April 1917 and the Battle of Cambrai in November 1917.

In October 1922, the regiment was amalgamated with the 3rd Dragoon Guards (Prince of Wales's) to form the 3rd/6th Dragoon Guards.

== Regimental museum ==
The regimental collection is held in the Cheshire Military Museum at Chester Castle. Some items are also held by the Royal Scots Dragoon Guards Museum at Edinburgh Castle.

== Battle honours ==
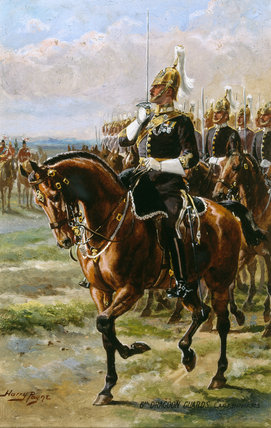
Regimental troops in 1905

The regiment's battle honours were as follows:

- Early Wars: Blenheim, Ramillies, Oudenarde, Malplaquet, Warburg, Willems, Sevastopol, Delhi 1857, Afghanistan 1879-80, Relief of Kimberley, Paardeberg, South Africa 1899-1902
- The Great War: Mons, Le Cateau, Retreat from Mons, Marne 1914, Aisne 1914, Messines 1914, Armentières 1914, Ypres 1915, St. Julien, Bellewaarde, Arras 1917, Scarpe 1917, Cambrai 1917 '18, Somme 1918, St. Quentin, Lys, Hazebrouck, Amiens, Bapaume 1918, Hindenburg Line, Canal du Nord, Selle, Sambre, Pursuit to Mons, France and Flanders 1914–18.

== Colonels ==
The regiment's colonels were as follows:

=== 1685 The Queen Dowager's Regiment of Horse ===
- 1685 Lieutenant-General Richard Lumley, 1st Earl of Scarbrough
- 1687 Brigadier-General Sir John Talbot
- 1688 Colonel Sir George Hewett, 1st Viscount Hewett
- 1689 Colonel Richard Beverley

=== 1692 The King's Regiment of Carabineers ===
- 1692 Lieutenant-General Hugh Wyndham
- 1706 Lieutenant-General Francis Palmes
- 1712 Colonel Leigh Backwell
- 1715 Brigadier-General Richard Waring
- 1721 Field Marshal Richard Boyle, 2nd Viscount Shannon
- 1727 Lieutenant-General George MacCartney
- 1730 Major-General Henry Scott, 1st Earl of Deloraine KB
- 1731 Field Marshal Sir Robert Rich, 4th Baronet
- 1733 Major-General Charles Cathcart, 8th Lord Cathcart

=== 1740 His Majesty's 1st Regiment of Carabiniers ===
- 1740 Lieutenant-General Phineas Bowles
- 1749 General Hon. James Cholmondeley
- 1750 Lieutenant-General George Germain, 1st Viscount Sackville

=== 1756 3rd Regiment of Horse (Carabiniers) ===
- 1757 Lieutenant-General Louis Dejean
- 1764 Lieutenant-General Edward Harvey
- 1775 General Sir William Augustus Pitt KB
- 1780 General Sir John Irwin KB

=== 1788 6th Regiment of Dragoon Guards ===
- 1788 General Henry Lawes Luttrell, 2nd Earl of Carhampton
- 1821 General Hon. Robert Taylor

=== 1826 6th Regiment of Dragoon Guards (Carabineers) ===
- 1839 General Sir Thomas Hawker KCB
- 1858 Lieutenant-General Sir Alexander Kennedy Clark-Kennedy KCB KH
- 1860 General Sir James Jackson GCB KH
- 1868 Lieutenant-General Sir John Rowland Smyth KCB
- 1873 General Henry Richmond Jones CB
- 1880 General George Calvert Clarke CB
- 1891 Lieutenant-General Charles Sawyer
- 1892 Major-General Sir Alexander James Hardy Elliot KCB
- 1902 Lieutenant-General Sir John Fryer KCB
- 1917 Major-General Henry Peregrine Leader CB
- 1922: regiment amalgamated with the 3rd Dragoon Guards (Prince of Wales's) to form the 3rd/6th Dragoon Guards

== Uniforms and Insignia ==
The original uniform of the Queen Dowager's Regiment of Horse is recorded as including a red coat lined with green. In common with other regiments of Horse, cuirasses were worn until 1699. In 1715 the regimental facing colour was changed to pale yellow. In 1768 white lapels were adopted by Royal Warrant. Silver epaulettes were worn by the officers. In 1812 a new model of leather helmet was issued, carrying the title of "6th Dragoon Guards or Carabiniers". In 1861 a complete change of uniform was authorized by Queen Victoria, following the conversion of the regiment to a light cavalry role and appearance. Thereafter until 1914 the full dress of the regiment was entirely dark blue with white facings. Although the designation of Dragoon Guards was retained, the 6th was the only dragoon regiment in the British Army to wear dark blue tunics instead of scarlet. After 1873, a white plume was worn on the brass helmet.

The distinctive feature of the collar and cap badges as worn from 1900 and 1902 respectively, was the appearance of crossed carbines under a crown and above the regimental title.

== See also ==
- British cavalry during the First World War
- Carabinier

== Sources ==
- Helms, M.W.; Henning, Basil Duke (1983). "TALBOT, John (1630–1714), of Lacock Abbey, Wilts., Long Acre, Westminster and Salwarp, Worcs". In Henning, Basil Duke (ed.). The History of Parliament:the House of Commons 1660-1690. Boydell and Brewer.
