= 3rd Dragoon Guards =

British Army cavalry regiment

3rd Dragoon Guards (Prince of Wales's Dragoon Guards)
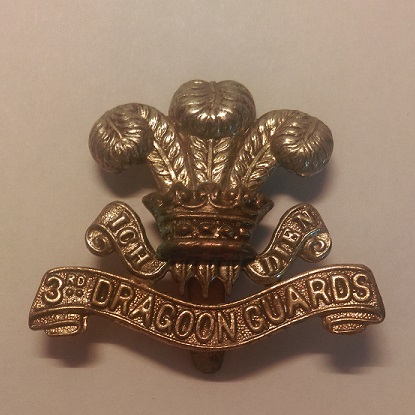
- Badge of the 3rd Dragoon Guards
- Active: 1685–1922
- Country: Kingdom of England (1685–1707); Kingdom of Great Britain (1707–1800); United Kingdom (1801–1922)
- Branch: Army
- Type: Line Cavalry
- Role: Cavalry
- Size: One regiment
- Garrison/HQ: RHQ
- Nickname: The Old Canaries
- Motto: Ich Dien (I Serve)
- March: Quick - God Bless the Prince of Wales; Slow - Men of Harlech

The 3rd (Prince of Wales's) Dragoon Guards was a cavalry regiment of the British Army, first raised in 1685 as the Earl of Plymouth's Regiment of Horse. It was renamed as the 3rd Regiment of Dragoon Guards in 1751 and the 3rd (Prince of Wales's) Dragoon Guards in 1765. It saw service for two centuries, including the First World War, before being amalgamated into the 3rd/6th Dragoon Guards in 1922.

== History ==
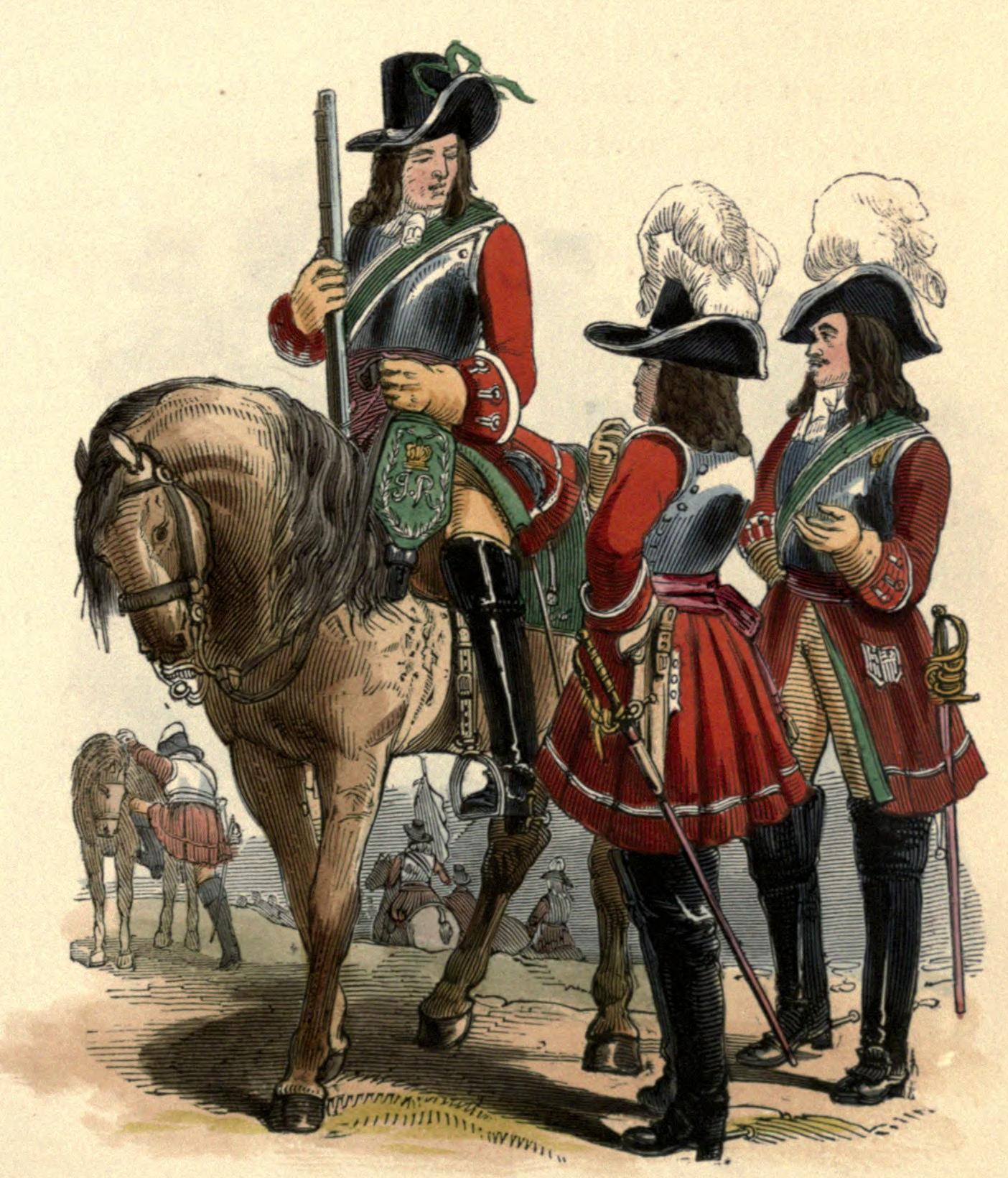
Regimental troops in 1687

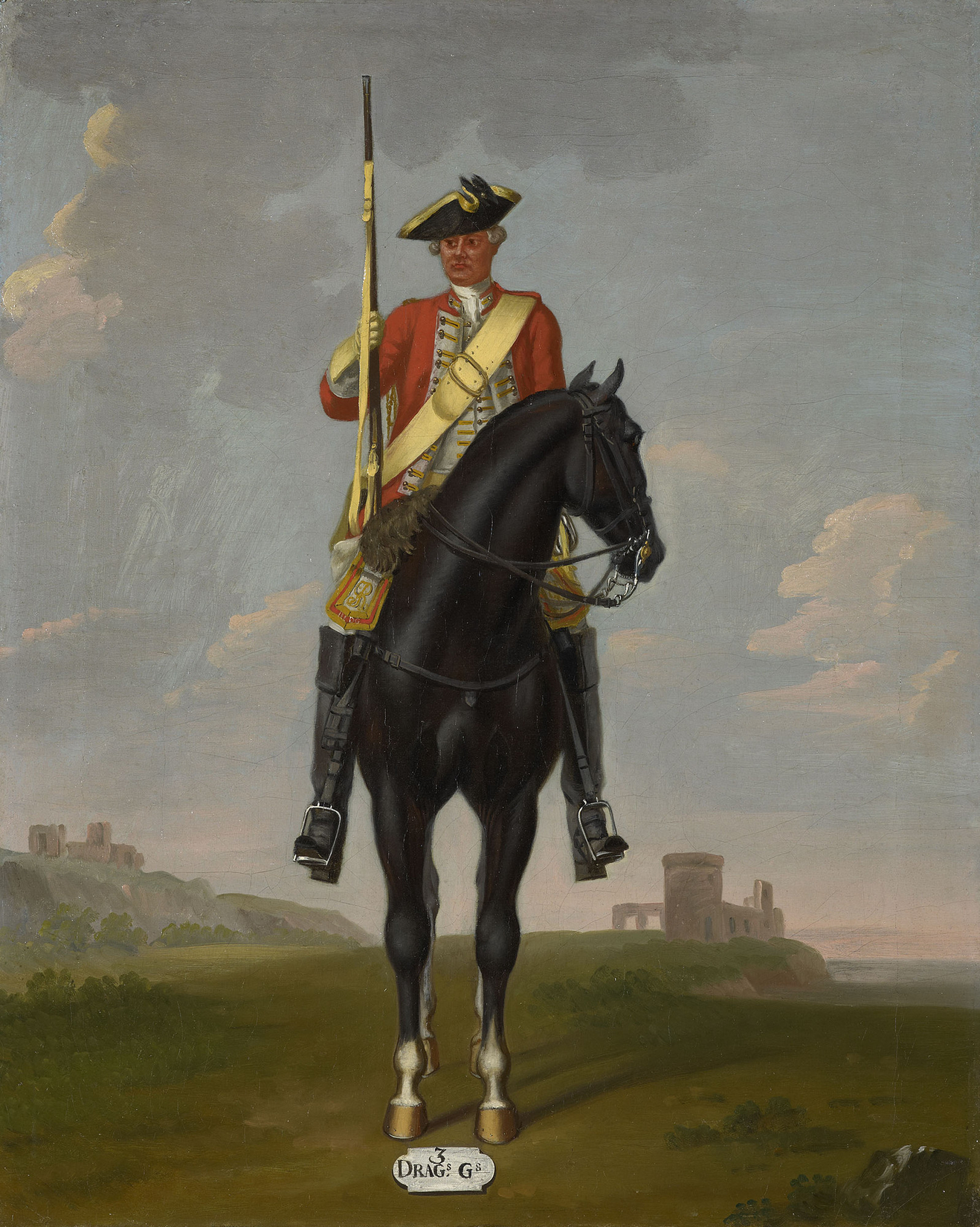
c. 1751 painting of a regimental private

The regiment was first raised by Thomas Hickman-Windsor, 1st Earl of Plymouth as the Earl of Plymouth's Regiment of Horse in 1685 as part of the response to the Monmouth Rebellion, by the regimenting of various independent troops, and was ranked as the 4th Regiment of Horse. The regiment saw action at the Battle of Schellenberg in July 1704, the Battle of Blenheim in August 1704, the Battle of Ramillies in May 1706, the Battle of Oudenarde in July 1708 and the Battle of Malplaquet in September 1709 during the War of the Spanish Succession. In 1746 it was ranked as the 3rd Dragoon Guards, and formally titled in 1751 as the 3rd Regiment of Dragoon Guards.

Regimental troops charging at rioters in Queen Square during the 1831 Bristol riots

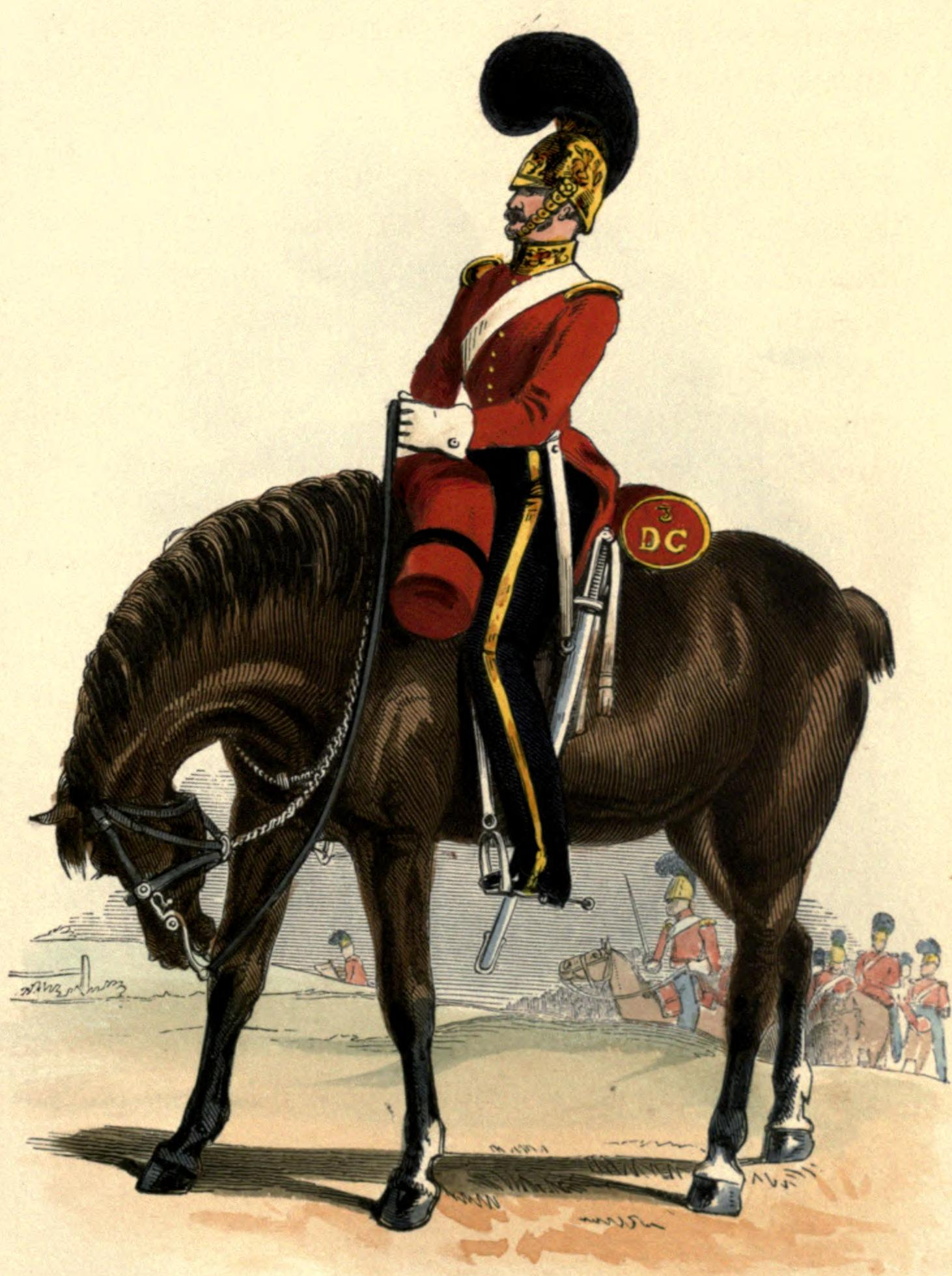
1838 illustration of a regimental officer

Shortly thereafter, in 1765, it took the title 3rd (Prince of Wales's) Dragoon Guards, for the future George IV. It took part in the suppression of the 1831 Bristol riots and, after service in India, took part in the British expedition to Abyssinia in 1868. The regiment was employed chasing Boer forces under General Christiaan de Wet in spring 1901 during the Second Boer War.

The regiment, which was in Cairo at the start of First World War, landed in France as part of the 6th Cavalry Brigade in the 3rd Cavalry Division in October 1914 for service on the Western Front where it fought at the First Battle of Ypres in October 1914, the Second Battle of Ypres in April 1915 and the Battle of Cambrai in November 1917. It retitled as 3rd Dragoon Guards (Prince of Wales's) in 1921, and was amalgamated with the 6th Dragoon Guards (Carabiniers) to form the 3rd/6th Dragoon Guards the following year.

== Regimental museum ==
The regimental collection is held in the Cheshire Military Museum at Chester Castle. Some items are also held by the Royal Scots Dragoon Guards Museum at Edinburgh Castle.

== Battle honours ==
The regiment was awarded the following battle honours:

- Early Wars: Blenheim, Ramillies, Oudenarde, Malplaquet, Warburg, Beaumont, Willems, Talavera, Albuhera, Vittoria, Peninsula, Abyssinia, South Africa 1901–02.
- The Great War: Ypres 1914, 1915, Nonne Bosschen, Frezenberg, Loos, Arras 1917, Scarpe 1917, Somme 1918, St. Quentin, Avre, Amiens, Hindenburg Line, Beaurevoir, Cambrai 1918, Pursuit to Mons, France and Flanders 1914–18.

== Commanding Officers ==
The Commanding Officers have been:

- 1958–1960: Lt.-Col. J. M. Ashton
- 1960–1962: Lt.-Col. George P. Badham
- 1962–1965: Lt.-Col. Edward I. Stanford
- 1965–1967: Lt.-Col. William R. B. Allen
- 1967–1970: Lt.-Col. Henry S. L. Dalzell-Payne
- 1970–1971: Lt.-Col. Anthony J. Bateman

== Colonels ==
The colonels of the regiment were as follows:

=== 1685 4th Regiment of Horse ===
- 1685 Thomas, Earl of Plymouth —Windsor's or The Earl of Plymouth's Regiment of Horse
- 1687 Sir John Fenwick —Sir John Fenwick's Horse
- 1688 Richard, Earl Rivers —Savage's or Earl Rivers' Horse
- 1693 John, Lord Berkeley —Lord Berkeley's Horse
- 1693 Cornelius Wood —Wood's Horse
- 1712 Thomas, Viscount Windsor —Lord Windsor's Horse
- 1717 George Wade —Wade's Horse

=== 1746 3rd Regiment of Horse ===
- 1748 Sir Charles Howard K B —Sir Charles Howard's Horse

=== 1751 3rd Regiment of Dragoon Guards ===
- 1751 Sir Charles Howard

=== 1765 3rd (Prince of Wales's) Dragoon Guards ===
- 1765 Gen. Lord Robert Manners
- 1782 Gen. Philip Honywood
- 1785 Lt-Gen. Richard Burton Phillipson
- 1792 Gen. Sir William Fawcett
- 1804 Gen. Richard Vyse
- 1825 Gen. Sir William Payne-Gallwey, 1st Baronet
- 1831 Gen. Samuel Hawker
- 1839 Lt-Gen. Sir James Charles Dalbiac
- 1842 Lt-Gen. Francis Newbery
- 1847 Gen. Charles Cathcart, 2nd Earl Cathcart
- 1851 Lt-Gen. James Claud Bourchier
- 1859 Gen. Sir John Scott
- 1866 Gen. Robert Richardson Robertson
- 1883 Gen. Sir William Henry Seymour
- 1891 Lt-Gen. Conyers Tower
- 1903 Maj-Gen. Andrew Smythe Montague Browne
- 1905 Maj-Gen. George Salis-Schwabe
- 1907 Maj-Gen. Sir Reginald Talbot
- 1920 Maj-Gen. Sir Nevill Maskelyne Smyth

=== 1921 3rd Dragoon Guards (Prince of Wales's) ===
- 1922: regiment amalgamated with the 6th Dragoon Guards (Carabiniers) to form the 3rd/6th Dragoon Guards

== See also ==
- British cavalry during the First World War

== Sources ==
- Chant, Christopher (18 October 2013). The Handbook of British Regiments (Routledge Revivals). Routledge. ISBN 978-1-134-64724-8.
- HMSO (13 February 2012). Battle Honours Awarded for the Great War. Andrews UK Limited. ISBN 978-1-78150-187-0.
