= Heavy Cavalry and Cambrai Band =

Former military band of the British Army

- Cap badge of the Heavy Cavalry & Cambrai Band
- Active: 1 June 2006 – early 2014
- Country: United Kingdom
- Branch: British Army
- Type: Military Band
- Size: 35-piece ensemble
- Part of: Corps of Army Music
- Garrison/HQ: Piave Lines, Catterick Garrison

The Heavy Cavalry and Cambrai Band (H & C Band) is a former military band of the Corps of Army Music, belonging to the British Army. Following the Army 2020 programme, the band was amalgamated with the Light Cavalry Band in early 2014 to form the new Band of the Royal Armoured Corps.

== History ==
The Heavy Cavalry and Cambrai Band was formed on 1 June 2006. As a consequence of Future Army Structures (a government review of the Armed Forces), the four bands of The Royal Armoured Corps were reduced to two. The Band of the Dragoon Guards was formed in 1994 when, as a result of the Options for Change (of 1991), the respective bands of the Queen's Dragoon Guards, The Royal Scots Dragoon Guards and The Royal Dragoon Guards (itself formed in 1992 by amalgamation of the 4th/7th Royal Dragoon Guards and 5th Royal Inniskilling Dragoon Guards) were all amalgamated. The title ‘Heavy Cavalry’ has been with Dragoon Regiments for hundreds of years as a result of the heavy body armour that was worn in battle.

The first official Band of the Royal Tank Regiment was formed in 1922. In 1947 it was expanded to become three separate bands, firstly named A, B and C Bands then later Cambrai, Alamein and Rhine. In August 1994 these bands joined forces to form Cambrai Band of the Royal Tank Regiment and were based in Fallingbostel, Northern Germany.

The Heavy Cavalry and Cambrai Band was one of the two new bands formed in 2006, essentially an amalgamation of The Band of the Dragoon Guards and Cambrai Band of the Royal Tank Regiment. Many of the band members were already serving at Catterick Garrison with either the Normandy Band of the Queen's Division or the Waterloo Band of the King's Division. The remaining musicians arrived from other prestigious bands from within the Corps of Army Music.

On 1 June 2006, the band formed up at Piave Lines, Catterick Garrison, now under control of the Corps of Army Music. For local administration, the 15th (North East) Brigade oversaw the band.

On Tuesday, 27 June 2007, the band left its base at Catterick Garrison for Wales to deploy on 'Exercise Welsh Eagle'. The first half of the tour saw the band providing musical support for the Queen's Dragoon Guards as they celebrated their Freedom of the City parade in Cardiff, Principality of Wales. The second part of the tour saw the band perform in North Wales at Bon-y-maen during a rugby match between the Queen's Dragoon Guards and a local team.

As a result of the Army 2020 programme, the band was amalgamated with the Light Cavalry Band to form the new Band of the Royal Armoured Corps.

== Structure ==
The establishment of the band in 2006 was 35 members (35-piece band), and was organised as follows:

- Marching Band
- Concert Band
- Brass Ensemble
- Wind Ensemble
- Fanfare Team
- Tanked Up (Rock & Roll Band)

In addition to the three above ensembles, a number of other "smaller and diverse ensembles" are used occasionally.

== Uniform ==
More detail needed here

=== Formation ===
Following the formation of the new band, the Band Uniform Working Group (BUWG) decided that the band's interim uniform would consist of half the band in Dragoon Guards attire and the other half in the Royal Tank Regiment's full dress uniform.

=== Standardisation ===
The uniform of the Heavy Cavalry and Cambrai Band was a mix of three heavy cavalry uniforms:

Percussion section uniformed similarly to the Band of the Royal Scots Dragoon Guards with a black bearskin and large red plume positioned horizontally over the cap, and gold strap.

Remainder of band uniformed similarly to the Royal Dragoon Guards with an Albert helmet with a red front and black plume drown down vertically. Initially, members of the old Cambrai Band of the Royal Tank Regiment were uniformed in their old dress except for a small vertical red plume above a black beret with the Royal Tank Regiment cap badge. However, by 2008 the uniform of these members was standardised to the new Albert helmet and plume.

== Directors of Music ==
The directors of music of the band were as follows:

- June 2006–unknown: Captain Jason Griffiths BA (Mus) MCMI LRSM MCGI
