= Alexander Elliot (British Army officer) =

British military officer (1825–1909)

Major-General Sir Alexander Elliot KCB
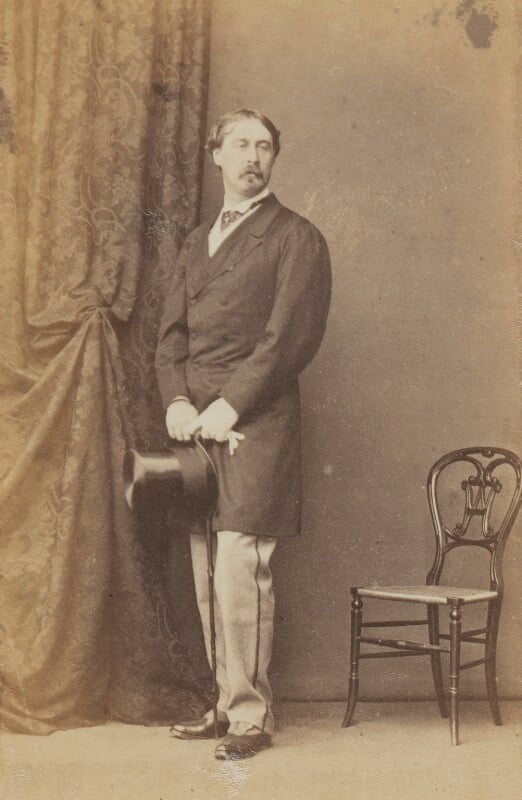
- Elliot in the early 1860s
- Born: 23 February 1825
- Died: 1 July 1909 (aged 84)
- Military career
- Allegiance: United Kingdom
- Branch: British Army
- Rank: Major-General
- Commands: Commander-in-Chief, Scotland
- Conflicts: Crimean War
- Awards: Knight Commander of the Order of the Bath

Major-General Sir Alexander James Hardy Elliot, KCB (23 February 1825 – 1 July 1909) was a British Army officer who served as Commander-in-Chief, Scotland from 1885 to 1888.

== Military career ==
Born the son of Admiral Sir George Elliot, Elloit was commissioned as a cavalry officer on 22 February 1843. He was promoted to cornet in the 9th Queen's Royal Lancers on 18 July 1848 and to lieutenant in the 5th Dragoon Guards on 14 June 1850. He served as aide-de-camp to General Sir James Scarlett, Commander of the Heavy Brigade, at the Battle of Balaclava in October 1854 during the Crimean War. He went on to command the troops in the North British District in 1885 and retired in 1888.

He was Colonel of the 6th Dragoon Guards (Carabiners) from 1892 to 1902, when he transferred to become Colonel of the 21st (Empress of India's) Lancers, serving as such until his death in 1909.

Military offices
Preceded by Alastair Macdonald	Commanding the troops in the North British District; 1885–1888	Succeeded by Sir Arthur Lyttelton-Annesley
Preceded by Charles Sawyer	Colonel of the 6th Dragoon Guards (The Carabiniers); 1892–1902	Succeeded by Sir John Fryer
Preceded by Sir Robert White	Colonel of 21st (Empress of India's) Lancers; 1902–1909	Succeeded by Sir Frederick William Benson
