= Henry Leader =

British Army major-general (1865–1934)

Major-General Henry Leader CB
- Born: 18 January 1865; Detroit, Michigan, United States
- Died: 22 September 1934 (aged 69); Appledorne, Devon, England
- Burial place: Instow, Devon, England
- Military career
- Allegiance: United Kingdom
- Branch: British Army
- Service years: 1885–1920
- Rank: Major-General
- Units: Suffolk Regiment; 6th Dragoon Guards (Carabiniers)
- Commands: 6th Dragoon Guards (Carabiniers); 1st Scottish Horse; Natal Militia; 2nd (Sialkot) Cavalry Brigade; 1st Indian Cavalry Division; Baluchistan Cavalry Force
- Conflicts: Second Boer War; First World War; Third Afghan War
- Awards: Companion of the Order of the Bath

Major-General Henry Peregrine Leader, CB (8 January 1865 – 22 September 1934) was a British Army officer. He served in the Second Boer War, the First World War and the Third Afghan War. He rose in rank to command his regiment, the 6th Dragoon Guards, two cavalry brigades and a cavalry division, for which he was invested with the Order of the Bath.

== Early life ==
Henry Peregrine Leader was born on 8 January 1865 in Detroit, Michigan, United States, the son of Henry Peregrine Leader and Caroline (née Farrar). His father had emigrated to Canada from the United Kingdom and had been an Army officer. Leader was educated in Canada, at Trinity College School, Port Hope and then at Royal Military College at Kingston.

== Infantry officer ==
Leader was commissioned in to the Suffolk Regiment in September 1885 and was promoted on merit to captain in December 1894.

== Cavalry officer ==
In January 1896, Leader joined the 6th Dragoon Guards (Carabiniers), by exchanging with a Captain K.J.R Campbell who went to the Suffolks. For the next two years, he carried out the appointment of Superintendent of Gymnasia, for the South East District. Then he was seconded to the general staff from April 1899, and served in the Cavalry Division with Major General Sir John French, in the Second Boer War. This was followed by promotion to major in July 1900. In 1901 he returned to the 6th Dragoons as the commanding officer (CO), but in February 1902 accepted the command of the 1st Scottish Horse with the local rank (in South Africa) of lieutenant colonel. The Scottish Horse was a Volunteer Force regiment raised in 1900, with drafts from Australia, Scotland and South Africa. Under Leader's command, the 1st battalion served in Northern Transvaal, and in late February captured a local Boer commandant and his laager at Gruisfontein (mentioned in despatches 25 April 1902). When the regiment was disbanded later in 1902, he was given command of the Natal Militia, with the rank of a brevet lieutenant colonel in the South African Honours list published on 26 June 1902.

Leader returned to the United Kingdom on the SS Kildonan Castle in August 1902, but was soon back again in South Africa to take ups his command in Natal. In July 1904 he was granted the local rank of brigadier general while commanding local forces in South-Africa, with the brevet rank of colonel. In 1905 he returned to command the 6th Dragoons, until completing his five years in command was put on the half-pay list, with the substantive rank of lieutenant colonel in May 1909. He was promoted to colonel on 1 May 1909.

== Higher command ==
Leader stayed on the half-pay list until June 1911 when he was appointed to the staff of the 2nd (Rawalpindi) Division of the British Indian Army. As a brigade commander once again with the temporary rank of brigadier general, and given command of the 2nd (Sialkot) Cavalry Brigade.

In the First World War, Leader took his brigade to the Western Front in France, serving with the 1st Indian Cavalry Division. He was promoted to substantive colonel in February 1915, but retained the temporary rank of brigadier general. Then in February 1916 he was given command of the 1st Indian Cavalry Division, with the temporary rank of major general, which in January 1917 became substantive. He relinquished command of the division later in late 1916, and moved to India as the temporary inspector of cavalry, a post he held until the Third Anglo-Afghan War, when he was given command of the Baluchistan Cavalry Force.

He retired from the army in December 1920, but remained colonel of the 6th Dragoon Guards regiment, an honorary position he had been given in 1917. When that regiment merged with the 3rd Dragoon Guards to form the 3rd/6th Dragoon Guards he became joint colonel of the new regiment.

== Death ==
Henry Peregrine Leader died 22 September 1934, in Devon, England aged 69. Leader and another Army officer, Colonel William Ralph Elliot Harrison, drowned just off Appledore when the yacht owned by Harrison sank. The yacht was overwhelmed by a strong wave and sank, Colonel Harrison's wife Ruth Harrison was picked up by the Appledore lifeboat alive, but the two former Army officers were found floating face-down and attempts on the lifeboat and later on the shore at Appledore failed to revive them.

Leader had married in 1889 in London to Olivia Claudine Thomson. His wife died in 1921.
