= Cheshire Military Museum =

Museum in Chester, Cheshire, England

Coordinates: 53.1865°N 2.8920°W

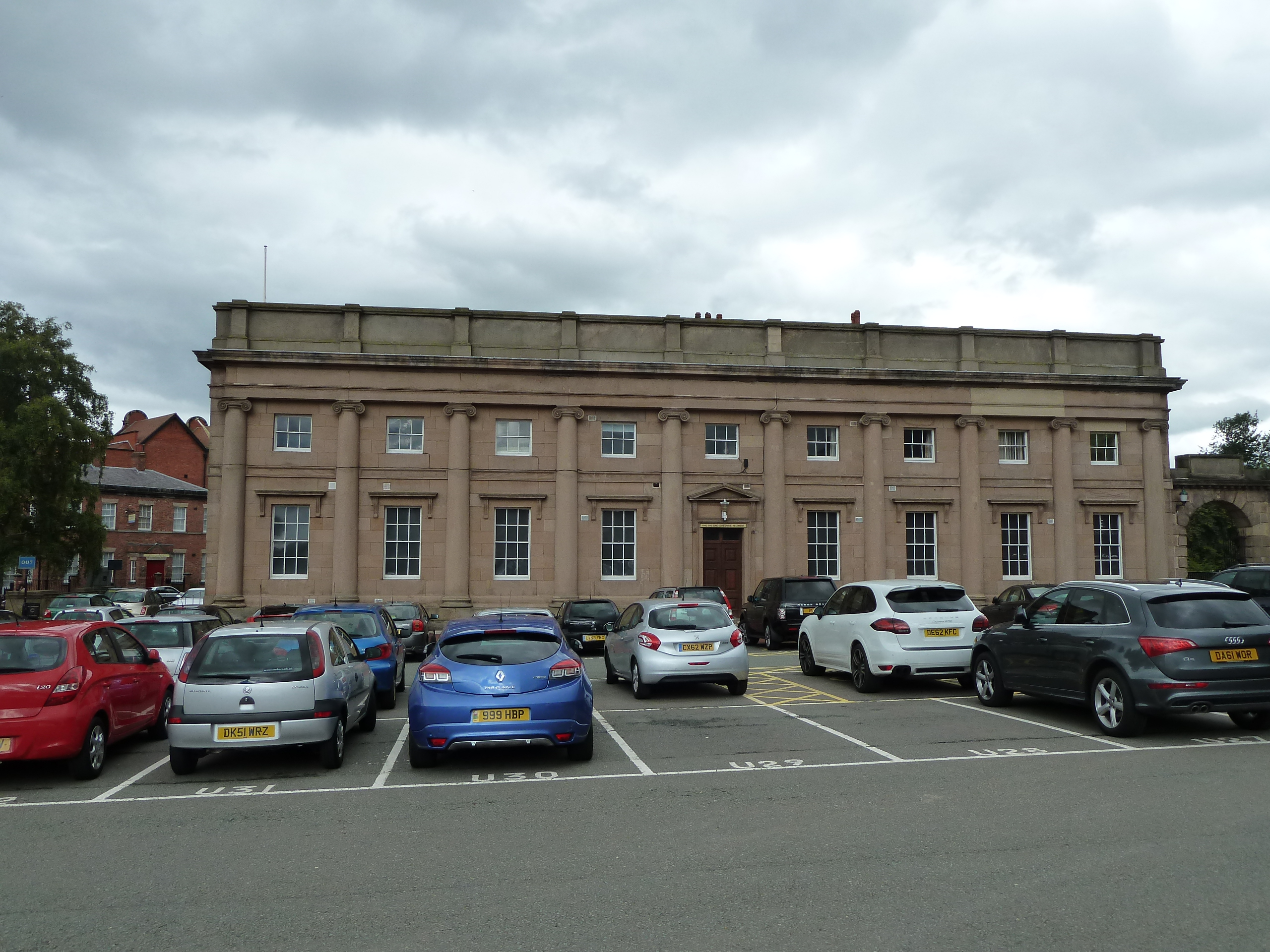
- The former A Block of Chester Castle, later used as the Cheshire Military Museum
- Established: 1972
- Location: Chester Castle
- Type: Military
- Website: cheshiremilitarymuseum.org.uk

Listed Building – Grade I
- Official name: A Block, Castle Square
- Designated: 26 February 1985
- Reference no.: 1271824

The Cheshire Military Museum is a military museum in Chester, Cheshire, England.

== History ==
The museum has been housed in the former A Block in Chester Castle since 1972. It covers the history of four British Army regiments connected with the County of Cheshire from 1685 onwards: the Cheshire Regiment, the Cheshire Yeomanry, the 3rd Carabiniers, the 5th Royal Inniskilling Dragoon Guards, and also the Eaton Hall Officer Cadet School. The building is recorded in the National Heritage List for England as a designated Grade I listed building.

== See also ==
- Grade I listed buildings in Cheshire West and Chester
- List of museums in Cheshire
