= Band of the Royal Armoured Corps =

- Active: 2014–2021
- Country: United Kingdom
- Branch: British Army
- Type: Military Band
- Role: Musical and Medical Support
- Size: Army Band
- Garrison/HQ: Piave & Bapaume Lines, Catterick Garrison

The Band of the Royal Armoured Corps was a mounted band of the Royal Corps of Army Music within the British Army. Although one of the newest bands their traditions go back can be traced to before 1939. Following the 2020 reorganisation of the RCAMUS, the band was disbanded, forming an element of the new British Army Band Catterick.

== History ==
The current band was formed in 2014 when the two former bands of the corps were merged. Those two bands being the Light Cavalry Band and the Heavy Cavalry and Cambrai Band.

From 22 to 24 June 2014 the band participated in a small tour through Austria, Germany, and finally The Kingdom of the Netherlands. The band along with members of the Queen's Dragoon Guards participated in the march in remembrance of Kaiser Franz Joseph, who was Colonel-in-Chief of the 1st (King's) Dragoon Guards. Their final stop was in Bad Ischl where they had a small parade commemorating the centenary of World War I.

On 18 July 2014 the band participated in the re-designation parade of the 1st (United Kingdom) Division and participated in a small parade. In early November 2014 the band along with members of the Band of the Princes of Wales' Division went to the Falkland Islands to participate in the local Remembrance commemorations. The second part of the band deployed to Afghanistan on an eight-day tour. Three members played Reveille and the Last Post for the US troops stationed in New Kabul Compounds Camp.

On 10 May 2019 the band performed in Saint Peter Port, Guernsey to support the island's liberation day during World War II. On 13 May 2019 the band performed in Berlin for the 70th Anniversary of the Berlin Airlift.

As part of the 2019–20 reorganisation of the then Corps of Army Music, the band joined the Band of the King's Division and Band of the Corps of Royal Electrical and Mechanical Engineers to form the new larger British Army Band Catterick. However, the bands still maintain their individual traditions, while their uniforms have become standardised.

The band is currently located at Piave & Bapaume Lines, Catterick Garrison.

== Organisation ==
Today the band is separated into five "sections":

- Wind Ensemble
- Brass Ensemble
- Fanfare Teams
- Marching Band
- Show Band
