= Orders Are Orders =

Orders Are Orders may refer to:

- Orders Are Orders (1955 film), a British comedy film, based on the play
- Orders Are Orders (play), a 1932 comedy play
- Orders Are Orders (1936 film), a German comedy film
