= Orders Is Orders =

- Directed by: Walter Forde
- Written by: Leslie Arliss; James Gleason
- Based on: Orders Are Orders by Ian Hay and Anthony Armstrong
- Produced by: Michael Balcon
- Starring: Charlotte Greenwood; James Gleason; Cyril Maude
- Cinematography: Glen MacWilliams
- Edited by: Derek Twist
- Music by: Louis Levy
- Production company: Gaumont British Picture Corporation
- Distributed by: Ideal Films
- Release date: 18 July 1933 (UK)
- Running time: 88 minutes
- Country: United Kingdom
- Language: English

Orders Is Orders (also known as Orders Are Orders) is a 1933 British comedy film directed by Walter Forde and starring Charlotte Greenwood, James Gleason and Cyril Maude. It was written by Leslie Arliss and James Gleason based on the 1932 play Orders Are Orders by Ian Hay and Anthony Armstrong.

An American film crew move into a British army barracks to start making a film, much to the commander's horror. It was shot at the Lime Grove Studios in London with sets designed by the art director Alfred Junge. Future Hollywood star Ray Milland appeared in a supporting role.

The film was remade in 1954 as Orders Are Orders starring Peter Sellers, Sid James and Tony Hancock.

== Cast ==
- Charlotte Greenwood as Wanda Sinclair
- James Gleason as Ed Waggermeyer
- Cyril Maude as Col. Bellamy
- Finlay Currie as Dave
- Percy Parsons as Zingbaum
- Cedric Hardwicke as Brigadier
- Donald Calthrop as Pavey
- Ian Hunter as Capt. Harper
- Jane Carr as Patricia Bellamy
- Ray Milland as Dashwood
- Edwin Lawrence as Quartermaster
- Eliot Makeham as Pvt. Slee
- Hay Plumb as Pvt. Goffin
- Wally Patch as Regimental Sergeant Major
- Jane Cornell as Starlet
- Glennis Lorimer as Marigold
- Sydney Keith as Rosenblatt

== Critical reception ==
Kine Weekly wrote: "Novel comedy burlesque, which brings the humors of American film production to England, and plants them in the fertile soil of an authentic British army setting. The scope and the resources of the screen mean additional fun to the story, which is adapted from the stage success, and the brilliant character acting of Cyril Maude and James Gleason, who are excellent in contrast, enables every phase of the lively and original entertainment to register. The film is presented on an ambitious scale, and its shafts of wit and satire will have no difficulty in piercing the humblest intellect."

The Daily Film Renter wrote: "James Gleason, as American director, makes great hit in deliciously extravagant satire, with Cyril Maude adding an outstandingly clever study as susceptible colonel. Realistic background emphasized by humour of soldier life and characteristic bustle of film unit on location. Outstanding entertainment for every section of the British public. Here is a hearty frolic which deliberately exceeds the most flexible bounds of probability, emerging as an excruciatingly funny sequence of events in which are hopelessly intertwined so incongruous a pair of activities as a film production unit and a rigidly disciplined military barracks."

In The New York Times, Mordaunt Hall called the film, "a tepid farce...It is an adaptation of a minor stage work written by Ian Hay and Anthony Armstrong, and the wonder is that the producers, Gaumont-British, thought it worthy of such an excellent company of players. On the credit side of this piece of buffoonery and punning there are the interesting glimpses in a military barracks, splendid photography and sound recording and good-natured work by the cast."
