= The Fight for the Standard =

Painting by Richard Ansdell

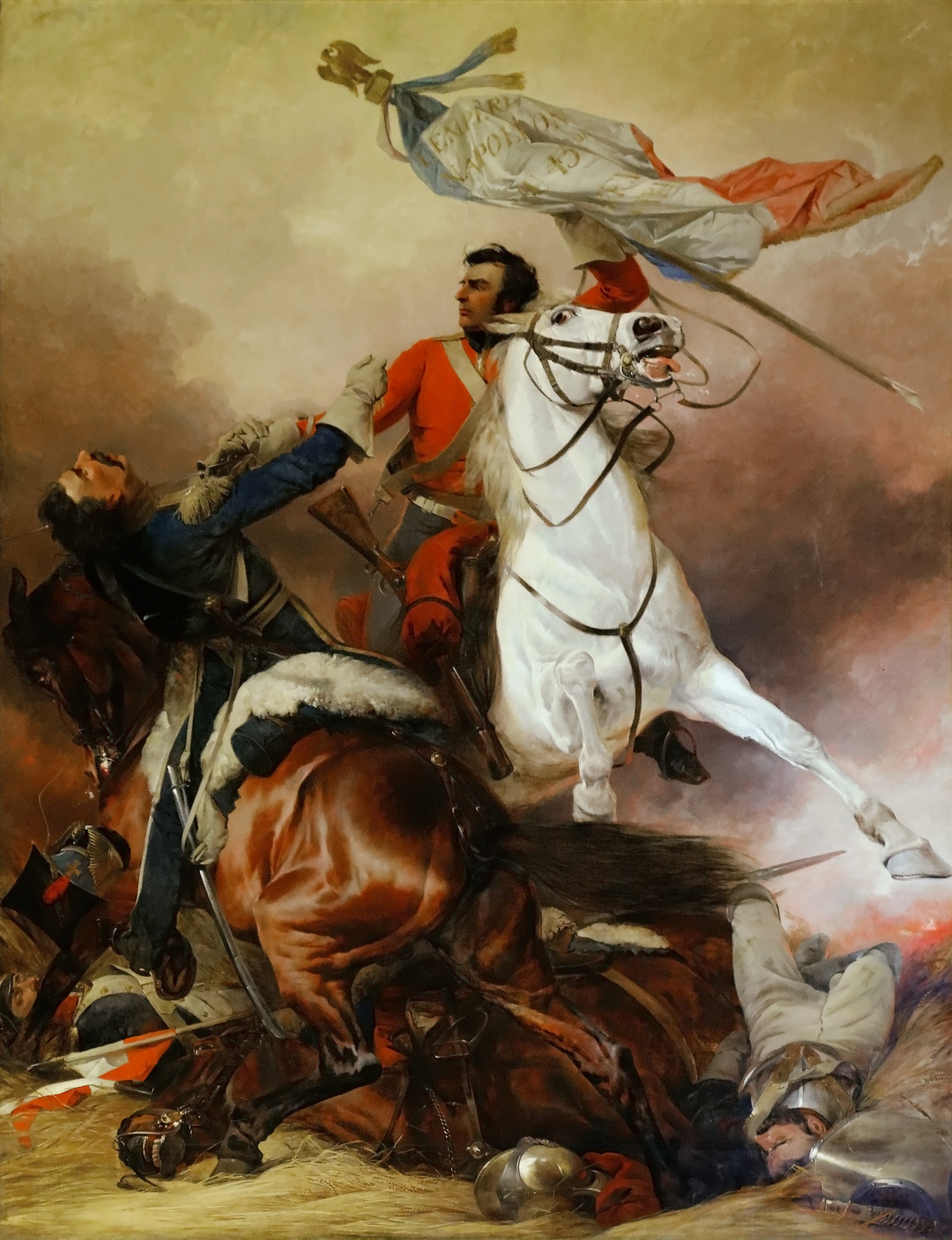
- Artist: Richard Ansdell
- Year: 1848
- Type: Oil on canvas, history painting
- Dimensions: 335.2 cm × 274.3 cm (132.0 in × 108.0 in)
- Location: Edinburgh Castle, Edinburgh

The Fight For The Standard is an oil on canvas history painting by the British artist Richard Ansdell, from 1848. A war painting, it depicts a scene from the Battle of Waterloo on 18 June 1815 during the Napoleonic Wars. A British cavalryman, Sergeant Charles Ewart of the Royal Scots Greys, is shown killing a French lancer while capturing a French Imperial Eagle, which he has taken from the 45th Line Infantry Regiment.

It was displayed at the Royal Academy's Summer Exhibition of 1848 at the National Gallery in London. The painting is in the collection of the Royal Hospital Chelsea but is on a long-term loan to Edinburgh Castle.

== Bibliography ==
- Todd, Arthur. The Life of Richard Ansdell, R. A. Sherratt & Hughes, 1919.
- Wright, Christopher, Gordon, Catherine May & Smith, Mary Peskett. British and Irish Paintings in Public Collections: An Index of British and Irish Oil Paintings by Artists Born Before 1870 in Public and Institutional Collections in the United Kingdom and Ireland. Yale University Press, 2006.
