= The Man in the Road =

1956 British film by Lance Comfort

- Directed by: Lance Comfort
- Written by: Guy Morgan
- Based on: He Was Found in the Road by Anthony Armstrong
- Produced by: Charles Leeds; Steven Pallos
- Starring: Derek Farr; Ella Raines; Donald Wolfit; Lisa Daniely
- Cinematography: Stanley Pavey
- Edited by: Jim Connock
- Music by: Bruce Campbell
- Production company: Gibraltar Films
- Distributed by: Grand National (UK); Republic Pictures (US)
- Release date: 16 April 1956
- Running time: 83 minutes
- Country: United Kingdom
- Language: English

The Man in the Road is a 1956 British second feature thriller film directed by Lance Comfort and starring Derek Farr, Ella Raines, Donald Wolfit and Cyril Cusack. It was written by Guy Morgan based on the 1952 novel He Was Found in the Road by Anthony Armstrong.

== Plot ==
A brilliant scientist suffering from amnesia is hunted by Communist agents in search of a secret formula.

== Cast ==
- Derek Farr as Ivan Mason/Doctor James Paxton
- Ella Raines as Rhona Ellison
- Donald Wolfit as Professor Cattrell
- Lisa Daniely as Nurse Mitzi
- Bruce Beeby as Doctor Manning
- Russell Napier as Superintendent Davidson of Scotland Yard
- Cyril Cusack as Doctor Kelly
- Frederick Piper as Inspector Hayman
- Karel Stepanek as Dmitri Balinkev
- Olive Sloane as Mrs Lemming, the landlady
- Alfred Maron as ambulance driver
- John Welsh as employer
- Robert Bruce as Scotland Yard Detective

== Production ==
The film was shot at Beaconsfield Studios.

== Critical reception ==
The Monthly Film Bulletin wrote: "Spy hokum concocted from a variety of well-tried ingredients (kidnapped scientist, hypnotism, amnesia) and lacking only a set of stolen secret plans. But it is all done with some gusto and played with appropriate seriousness. The best performances come from Cyril Cusack, effective as an alcoholic doctor, and from Russell Napier, with a reliable impersonation of a Scotland Yard superintendent."

Britmovie called the film a "fast-paced, implausible, but engrossing Cold War spy thriller."

TV Guide wrote, "the complicated plot never really amounts to anything more than predictable propaganda, though a capable cast handles the material in a professional and convincing manner."

Leslie Halliwell said: "Mildly diverting spy caper with a good cast."

The Radio Times Guide to Films gave the film 2/5 stars, writing: "A surprisingly fine cast was assembled for this unremarkable quickie adapted from the espionage thriller by Anthony Armstrong. ...Donald Wolfit was knighted the same year, but surely not on the strength of his performance here as a blustering professor."

In British Sound Films: The Studio Years 1928–1959 David Quinlan rated the film as "average", writing: "Nothing new here, but well acted by solid cast."
