= Orders Are Orders (1955 film) =

British comedy by David Paltenghi

- Theatrical release poster
- Directed by: David Paltenghi
- Written by: Geoffrey Orme; Donald Taylor; Eric Sykes (additional dialogue)
- Based on: Orders Are Orders by Anthony Armstrong and Ian Hay
- Produced by: Donald Taylor
- Starring: Brian Reece; Peter Sellers; Tony Hancock; Sid James
- Cinematography: Arthur Grant
- Edited by: Joseph Sterling
- Music by: Stanley Black
- Production company: Group 3 Films
- Distributed by: British Lion Film Corporation
- Release date: 8 May 1955
- Running time: 78 minutes
- Country: United Kingdom
- Language: English
- Box office: £84,148 (UK)

Orders Are Orders is a 1955 British comedy film directed by David Paltenghi, and featuring Brian Reece, Peter Sellers, Sid James, Tony Hancock, Raymond Huntley, and Bill Fraser. It was written by Geoffrey Orme and Donald Taylor. Eric Sykes contributed to the script and appears in a minor role. It was a remake of the film Orders Is Orders (1933), itself based on the 1932 play Orders Are Orders by Ian Hay and Anthony Armstrong.

== Plot ==
A film production company decides to make a new space adventure film close to an army barracks, using the soldiers as extras. This does not go down well with the commanding officer, who attempts to make life as difficult as possible for the film crew.

== Cast ==
- Brian Reece as Captain Harper
- Margot Grahame as Wanda Sinclair
- Raymond Huntley as Colonel Bellamy
- Sid James as Ed Waggermeyer
- Tony Hancock as Lt Wilfred Cartroad, the bandmaster
- Peter Sellers as Private Goffin
- Clive Morton as General Sir Cuthbert Grahame-Foxe
- June Thorburn as Veronica Bellamy
- Maureen Swanson as Joanne Delamere
- Peter Martyn as Lieutenant Broke
- Bill Fraser as Private Slee
- Edward Lexy as Captain Ledger
- Barry MacKay as RSM Benson
- Maureen Pryor as Miss Marigold
- Donald Pleasence as Lance Corporal Martin
- Eric Sykes as Private Waterhouse
- Gerald Campion as Private Johnson
- Leonard Williams as Corporal Smithers
- David Lodge (uncredited)

== Media releases ==
The film was released on region two DVD in 2007.

== Critical reception ==
The Monthly Film Bulletin wrote: "A rough-and-tumble farce of the most rudimentary order, lacking even a proper story. The original play (of 1932) is almost unrecognisable; though occasional lines of the original corn momentarily but unmistakably shine through the new layers of chaff. The only moments of real brightness, however, are provided by Tony Hancock, a delightful droll as Lt. Cartroad."

Picture Show wrote: "Based on the amusing stage play, this film is at times really hilarious ... Extremely well acted, it is neatly directed."

TV Guide wrote: "except for a couple of decent comic performances, the good cast, including both Peter Sellers and Donald Pleasence in early roles, are wasted by the film's haphazard construction."

Time Out wrote: "just about worth suffering to see Tony Hancock in his film debut as the harassed bandmaster."
