= Jimmie Rezaire =

1927 novel

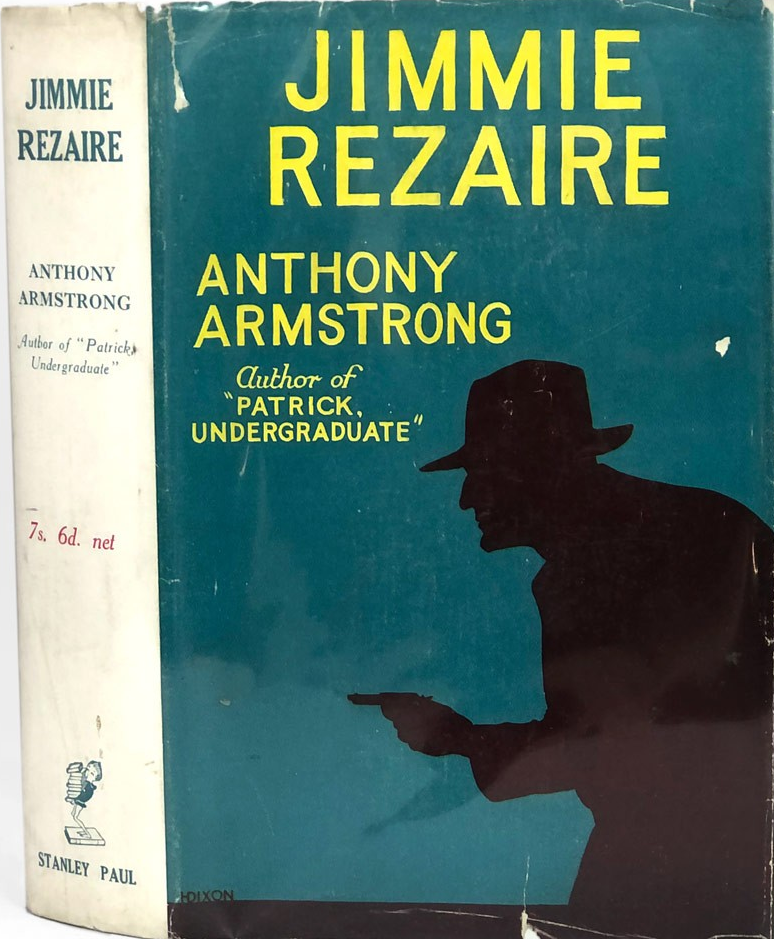
- Author: Anthony Armstrong
- Language: English
- Genre: Thriller
- Publisher: Stanley Paul
- Publication date: 1927
- Publication place: United Kingdom
- Media type: Print
- Followed by: The Secret Trail

Jimmie Rezaire is a 1927 thriller novel by the British author Anthony Armstrong. It was the first in a series of five novels featuring the title character, a former cocaine smuggler who changes sides and becomes a private detective on the right side of the law. It was published in the United States under the alternative title The Trail of Fear.

== Bibliography ==
- Hubin, Allen J. Crime Fiction, 1749-1980: A Comprehensive Bibliography. Garland Publishing, 1984.
- Kabatchnik, Amnon. Blood on the Stage, 1925-1950: Milestone Plays of Crime, Mystery and Detection. Scarecrow Press, 2010.
