= Jeremy Maas =

English art dealer and art historian

- Born: Jeremy Stephen Maas; 31 August 1928 (age 97); Penang, then in British Malaya
- Education: Pembroke College, Oxford (BA)
- Occupations: Art gallery owner and art historian
- Spouse: Antonia Armstrong Willis (m. 1956)
- Children: 3, including Rupert Maas

Jeremy Stephen Maas (31 August 1928 – 23 January 1997) was an English art dealer and art historian, best known for his expertise in Victorian painting.

== Early and private life ==
Maas was born in Penang, then in British Malaya. His father, Oscar Henry Maas (1884–1957), was the son of a Dutch diplomat, and owned a rubber plantation. His mother, Marjorie Turner Maas (née Pope) (1893–1988), was American.

He was educated at Sherborne School and then undertook National Service. He studied English at Pembroke College, Oxford graduating, with a third-class BA degree, in 1952.

In 1956 he married Antonia Armstrong Willis, daughter of Canadian writer Anthony Armstrong; she was an equestrian and an artist. They had three children: first a daughter, Athena, and then two sons Rupert and Jonathan. Rupert has since become well known through the BBC television series Antiques Roadshow.

== Maas Gallery ==
After employment in advertising and printing, he followed his interest in Victorian painting – sparked by reading William Gaunt's Aesthetic Adventure at university – and moved to work at Bonhams auction house, where he established the watercolour and drawings department.

Maas opened his own retail gallery, the Maas Gallery, in December 1960. The gallery was based in Clifford Street in Mayfair, near Bond Street, London. The gallery specialized in Victorian art – paintings, watercolours, and drawings – which at the time was unfashionable and often difficult to sell. He revived interest in the works of the Pre-Raphaelite Brotherhood, and held the first of a series of commercial exhibitions in December 1961. The gallery also exhibited works by contemporary painters, such as Elinor Bellingham-Smith and John Stanton Ward.

Maas sold a painting of the 1834 fire at the House of Commons, at that time attributed to J. M. W. Turner, to Paul Mellon, and sold a painting by Pietro da Cortona to the Metropolitan Museum of Art. He was also involved in the rediscovery and sale of many lost works, including Frederic Leighton's Flaming June (1895), and a painting of Saint Cecilia by John William Waterhouse that was found rolled up in France.

He published several books, including a work on Victorian Painters in 1969; a biography of the art dealer Gambart, Prince of the Victorian Art World in 1975; and two books on individual paintings by William Powell Frith and William Holman Hunt: The Prince of Wales' Wedding in 1977, and Holman Hunt and the Light of the World in 1984. His collection of photographs and cartes-de-visites of artists inspired another book The Victorian Art World in Photographs, also published in 1984.

Maas died at his home, "Martins", in Amberley near Arundel in Sussex, of renal failure and arterial disease. He was buried at St Michael's Church in Amberley.

An exhibition of fairy paintings at the Royal Academy in 1997 was dedicated to Maas. After his death, his elder son Rupert took over the Maas Gallery.

== Other sources ==
Wood, Christopher (2004). "Maas, Jeremy Stephen (1928–1997)". Oxford Dictionary of National Biography (online ed.). Oxford University Press. doi:10.1093/ref:odnb/65709. (Subscription, Wikipedia Library access or UK public library membership required.)
