= Mile Away Murder =

1937 play

- Written by: Anthony Armstrong
- Original language: English
- Genre: Crime mystery

Premiere
- Date premiered: 2 April 1937
- Place premiered: Duchess Theatre, London

Mile Away Murder is a 1937 murder mystery play by the British writer Anthony Armstrong. It ran at the Duchess Theatre in London's West End between 2 April and 8 May 1937. The cast included Walter Hudd, D. A. Clarke-Smith, Wilfred Caithness, Oliver Johnston, Evelyn Roberts and Gillian Maude. It received a negative review in The New Statesmanwhich considered it unmysterious while The New York Times described it as "highly competent".

== Bibliography ==
- Wearing, J. P. The London Stage 1930–1939: A Calendar of Productions, Performers, and Personnel. Rowman & Littlefield, 2014.
- Willison, I.R. (ed.) The New Cambridge Bibliography of English Literature: Volume 4, 1900–1950. Cambridge University Press, 1972.
