= The Strange Case of Mr Pelham =

The Strange Case of Mr. Pelham
- First edition (UK)
- Author: Anthony Armstrong
- Language: English
- Genre: Suspense
- Publisher: Methuen
- Media type: Print

"The Strange Case of Mr. Pelham" is a 1940 short story (later expanded in book form in 1957) by English writer Anthony Armstrong about a man involved in a serious car accident. The man recovers only to find himself being stalked by a seemingly identical version of himself.

It is also known as The Case of Mr Pelham.

The book was reprinted in 2021 by B7 Media, available on Amazon.

== Adaptations ==
- It was adapted for BBC radio in 1946.
- It was filmed for the BBC in 1948 and 1955.
- It was made into an episode of Alfred Hitchcock Presents which originally aired December 4, 1955, under the title "The Case of Mr. Pelham", and starring Tom Ewell as the victim of his own Doppelgänger. The episode was directed by Hitchcock himself.
- turned into full length book form in 1957
- The story was adapted for Australian radio in 1959 as an episode of Harry Death's Playhouse.
- The story was also made into the theatrical film The Man Who Haunted Himself in 1970 starring Roger Moore. It was director Basil Dearden's last film, as he died soon afterwards in a car accident.

== Critical reception ==
Anthony Boucher commented on the novel as "a lightly amusing tale of suspense and terror and, read as fantasy, an attractive book"; Boucher, however, also quoted another reviewer who found that, reading the novel as a genre mystery, it was "an extraordinarily irritating piece of cleverness."
