= Ernest Gambart =

Belgian-born British art dealer and publisher (1814–1902)

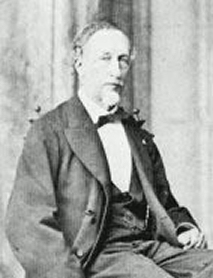
- Photograph of Gambart in later life, date unknown
- Born: Jean Joseph Ernest Théodore Gambart; 12 October 1814; Kortrijk, Belgium
- Died: 12 April 1902 (aged 87); Nice, France
- Occupations: Art dealer, publisher, printseller
- Known for: Founder of the French Gallery, London
- Spouses: Anne Codant (died); Mary Matilda (m. 1842, died); Annie Baines (m. 1851; died 1870)

Jean Joseph Ernest Théodore Gambart (12 October 1814 – 12 April 1902) was a Belgian-born British art dealer, publisher and printseller who dominated the London art market during the middle decades of the nineteenth century. After arriving in London as the representative of the French publishers Goupil & Cie in 1840, he established his own business as E. Gambart & Co. and became a naturalised British subject in 1846. Through his activities as a publisher, dealer and exhibition organiser, he helped transform the marketing and sale of contemporary art in Britain, and is regarded by art historians as one of the principal architects of the modern international art market.

Initially a publisher of reproductive engravings, he built a successful business by acquiring copyright in contemporary paintings and issuing high-quality prints through subscription. He worked with many of the leading British and European artists of the Victorian era, including Edwin Landseer, John Everett Millais, William Holman Hunt, William Powell Frith, Rosa Bonheur, Lawrence Alma-Tadema, Paul Delaroche, and Abraham Solomon. His commercial success demonstrated the growing importance of copyright, reproduction rights and international distribution in the nineteenth-century art trade.

From the 1850s he expanded into dealing in original paintings, establishing the French Gallery in Pall Mall, one of London's earliest commercial galleries devoted to contemporary art. Through its exhibitions he introduced French painting to British audiences, promoted emerging artists, and pioneered new methods of exhibiting and marketing art outside the Royal Academy system. His promotion of Bonheur's The Horse Fair and his early support of Alma-Tadema were among his greatest commercial successes, while his practice of combining exhibitions with the publication of engraved reproductions became widely imitated by later dealers.

After retiring from business in 1870, he settled principally in Nice, where he served as Spanish Consul-General and assembled an important art collection. His former firm ultimately evolved into the Lefevre Gallery, one of Britain's leading twentieth-century commercial galleries. Although later overshadowed by dealers such as Joseph Duveen, Gambart is recognised as a pioneering figure in the professionalisation and internationalisation of the Victorian art market, and whose business methods influenced the relationship between artists, dealers, collectors and the wider public.

== Early life and career ==
Ernest Gambart was born in Kortrijk in Belgium, the son of Joseph Théodore Gambart, a printer, binder and bookseller, and Euphrasie Cartellier de Courval. By the age of 19, he had moved to Paris where he established his own print and papermaking business. He soon joined the leading print publishers Goupil; in 1840, Adolphe Goupil sent him to England to assess the British market and establish a branch of the business.

In 1842 he left Goupil and entered partnership with Auguste Lazare Junin to form the company Gambart & Junin, which specialised in the importing of colour Continental lithographic art prints. The company was a success, and by early in 1844 the company was established as publishers as well as importers and exporters. After Junin's death in 1847, he continued the business under his own name as E. Gambart & Co., located at 25 Berners Street, near Oxford Street. Gambart became a naturalised British subject in 1846.

== Art publisher ==
During the 1840s he became Britain's leading publisher of reproductive engravings after contemporary paintings. Rather than merely issuing prints, he negotiated exclusive copyright agreements with artists, purchased reproduction rights, and marketed engravings through subscription.

He established fair and mutually beneficial agreements with most of the best known British and European artists of the mid-Victorian period, including Edwin Landseer, John Everett Millais, Rosa Bonheur, Lawrence Alma-Tadema, William Holman Hunt, John Linnell, J. M. W. Turner, David Roberts, Frederick Goodall, Dante Gabriel Rossetti, Ford Madox Brown, William Powell Frith and James Sant. Gambart employed leading engravers and later adopted colour lithography to improve the fidelity of reproductions.

== The French Gallery ==
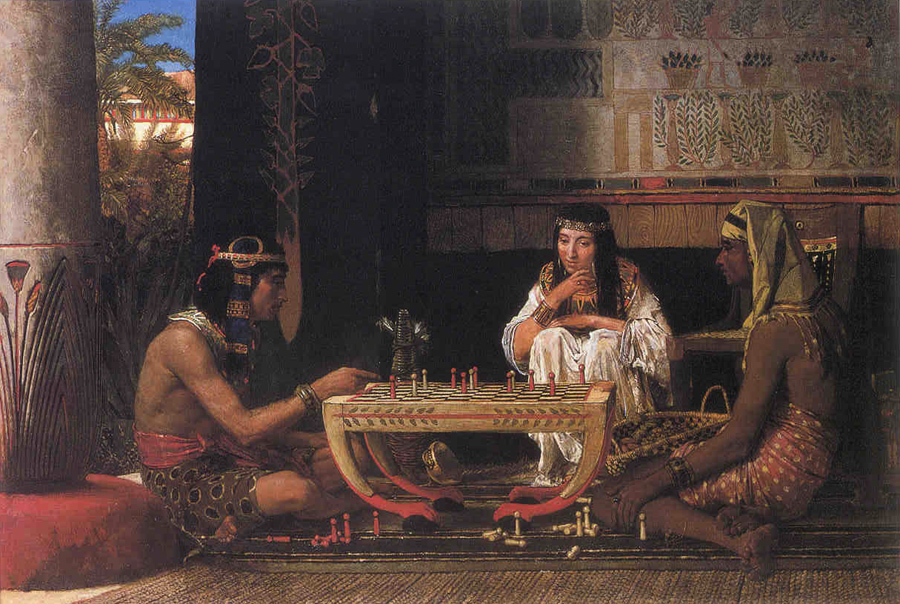
Amongst others, Gambart promoted Lawrence Alma-Tadema, possibly the most successful painter of the Victorian era. Egyptian Chess Players (1865)was the first picture he finished for Gambart.

Having established himself as Britain's leading publisher of reproductive engravings, by the early 1850s he increasingly turned to dealing in original paintings, applying many of the same commercial methods to the exhibition and sale of contemporary art. Around 1854 he established a gallery at 120–121 Pall Mall, London, one of Britain's earliest permanent commercial galleries devoted to the sale of contemporary art. His first exhibition was the bronzes of Pierre-Jules Mène, sculptor of animals. In time, his exhibitions, often featuring French artists, became known as the French Gallery and an exhibition at the gallery was regarded as commercially valuable. The gallery exhibited annual displays of French painting alongside exhibitions of British artists, helping introduce Continental art to Victorian audiences at a time when the Royal Academy Summer Exhibition still dominated the London exhibition calendar. He later transferred his business to King Street, St James's. He alternated works for sale by British artists and Continental European ones such as Paul Delaroche and Rosa Bonheur in two annual events, the Winter Exhibition of British artists and the Spring Exhibition of French and Continental artists. The French Gallery quickly became the principal vehicle through which Gambart promoted the artists he represented.

He was among the first to sell art in this way; prior to his galleries, most fine art was sold by the artist directly to the buyer, who was often a patron. His friendship with many of the artists and buyers, including pen-maker and well-known patron Joseph Gillott, as well as with critics, would become a model for how the art business would be run in the future. He ensured his exhibition premises carried an air of luxury and privilege, and charged entrance fees in order to maintain a level of exclusivity. He strove for a cosmopolitan appeal and balanced private, commercial interests with public values, such as education and the elevation of taste through international collaboration.

He helped to establish the reputation of some of the artists; for example, in 1855 he brought Rosa Bonheur to England with her monumental painting, The Horse Fair, which he bought for forty thousand francs so that he could display the painting at the French Gallery. Through this exhibition, Bonheur's work was recognised by several English critics, such as William Michael Rossetti who commented on it positively, and the painting was shown to Queen Victoria at Windsor Castle in a private audience. For the same visit, he arranged a stay in Scotland where Bonheur made sketches for later works. He published many of her paintings as steel engraved reproductions. Through his efforts, Bonheur became better known in England than her native France, and one of the most successful artists he represented.

Having established Bonheur's reputation in Britain during the 1850s, he repeated many of the same promotional techniques with younger Continental artists during the following decade, most notably the Dutch-born Lawrence Alma-Tadema, who first met Gambart in 1864. Gambart was impressed by the young man's work, and arranged an exhibition in London in 1865 and promoted his work while the artist remained in Belgium. Alma-Tadema moved permanently to London in 1870. According to Gambart's biographer Jeremy Maas, "Gambart found a painter who was tailor-made to his requirements ... Alma-Tadema was Gambart's greatest creation." E. Gambart & Co. and its successor firm Pilgeram & Lefèvre, established by Gambart with his nephew, commissioned a total of 72 paintings from Alma-Tadema, at least 19 of which were reproduced.

According to Alma-Tadema's biographer Vern Grosvenor Swanson, "With offices in several European capitals, and headquarters in London, Gambart's power and influence were considerable. Wherever he went, the whisper 'Gambart is here' would be heard in artistic circles, and every opportunity and subterfuge used by painters to induce him to visit their studios." He was among the top three dealers in London at a time when art was in high demand, his challengers being Agnew's, and P. & D. Colnaghi & Co., and was nicknamed "the Prince of Victorian Art". In the following decades, other dealers emulated Gambart and named their galleries after specific national schools, regularly promoting artists from them, including the German Gallery, the Belgian Gallery, the Dutch Gallery, the Continental Gallery, and the Japanese Gallery.

== Business methods and innovations ==
Gambart introduced commercial practices that became standard in the international art market. He negotiated exclusive contracts, controlled copyright and reproduction rights, staged single-artist exhibitions, cultivated critics and collectors, and combined the sale of original paintings with engraved reproductions aimed at a much wider public. His combination of copyright ownership, international distribution and carefully managed publicity became an influential model for later art dealers.

Rather than depending solely upon aristocratic patronage, he marketed artists to an expanding middle-class audience through exhibitions, illustrated catalogues and subscription prints. These innovations substantially increased both artists' incomes and the commercial value of their work.

He worked with some of the finest engravers and technicians of his day, such as Charles George Lewis, to create works as close to the artist's intent as possible in a black and white medium. He also later employed colour lithography. His attention to quality paid off both in the arrangements he maintained with leading artists and also in sales. Among his best selling reproductions were William Holman Hunt's The Light of the World (1853), an inspiring and highly influential image of Christ, and William Powell Frith's The Derby Day (1858).

Art historian Pamela Fletcher argues that Gambart transformed the relationship between artists, dealers and collectors by creating an exhibition space in which dealers, rather than artists or academies, controlled the presentation and marketing of contemporary art.

== Artistic copyright ==
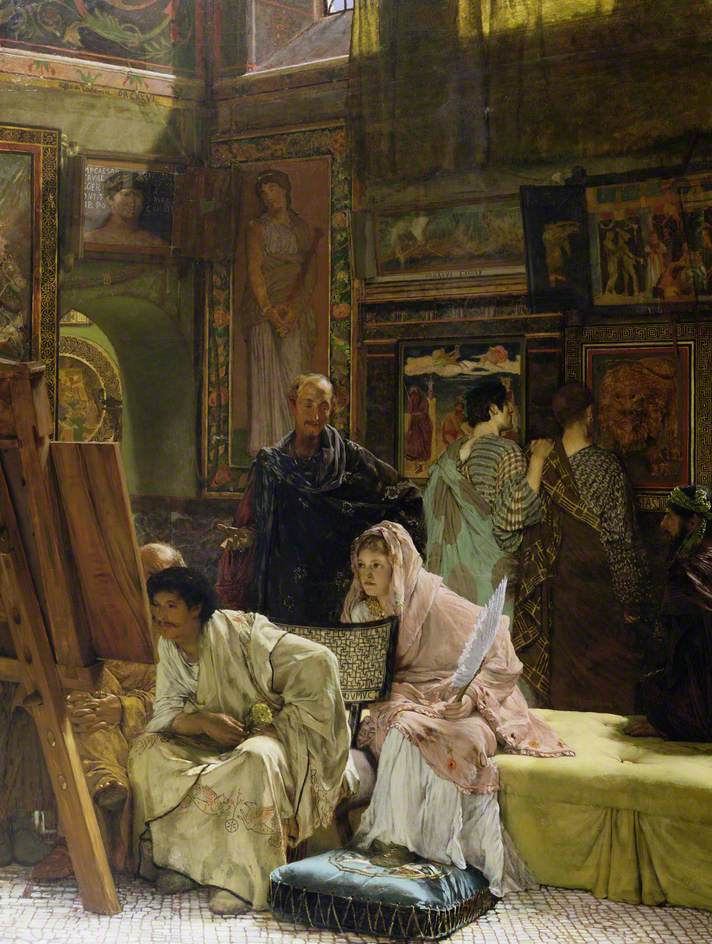
The Picture Gallery (1874) by Lawrence Alma-Tadema, Towneley Hall Art Gallery and Museum. The painting shows an Ancient Roman gallery filled with customers; the central figure is Gambart, in Roman dress, discussing a painting or praising his wares..

Gambart's increasingly sophisticated publishing business depended upon securing exclusive reproduction rights to many of the paintings he promoted, and he became one of the leading advocates of artistic copyright in Victorian Britain. His business model depended upon purchasing the rights to reproduce popular paintings as engraved prints, and investing large sums in commissioning steel engravings of them. Producing a high-quality engraving required highly skilled engravers and substantial investment, and could take years. The advent of photography threatened this model: photographs could be produced quickly, were much cheaper than engraved prints, and they bypassed the publisher who had purchased engraving rights. If inexpensive photographic or lithographic copies appeared before Gambart had recovered his investment, the commercial value of his copyright could collapse. Copyright therefore protected not only artists but also the substantial financial investment required to reproduce paintings for the mass market. After repeated copyright disputes, he wrote a pamphlet in 1863, On Piracy of Artistic Copyright, addressed to Parliament and the public, which argued that copyright protected investment rather than monopoly, distinguished legitimate competition from piracy, and advocated stronger statutory remedies. He concluded that "It is not, […] against competition that protection for copyright in art-works is demanded, […] but against robbers." A review of the pamphlet in The Art Journal indicate that his arguments were discussed contemporaneously and that reviewers agreed with some of his criticisms while questioning others.

He became involved in several important copyright actions during the late 1850s and early 1860s, including Gambart v Sumner (1859), Gambart v Ball (1863), and Gambart v Mayne (1863). These cases concerned photographs made from copyrighted engraved reproductions of paintings, particularly of Solomon's paintings Second Class - The Parting and First Class - The Meeting, Hunt's The Light of the World, and Bonheur's The Horse Fair. The decisions were among the earliest English cases addressing the application of copyright law, especially the new Fine Art Copyright Act (1862), to photographic reproduction, and helped clarify how existing legislation applied to new imaging technologies. His legal campaign was as much about protecting the economic viability of line engraving as about protecting artists.

His insistence on enforceable copyright reflected a broader transformation in the Victorian art market. Dealers increasingly invested not only in original paintings but also in the intellectual property associated with them, making copyright a commercial asset alongside the artwork itself. Art historians regard this shift as one of the defining features of the nineteenth-century international art trade. However, although he argued passionately against piracy he simultaneously made art increasingly commercial through the large-scale marketing of reproductive prints. He criticised unauthorised copying but his own publishing practices helped transform paintings into mass-market commodities.

These legal and commercial campaigns occupied much of his later career before his retirement from active business in 1870.

== Retirement and later life ==
In 1867 Gambart sold the lease of the French Gallery and established a new gallery with his nephew Léon Lefèvre, and F. G. Pilgeram. He retired from active business in 1870, leaving the firm in their hands. Its successor, the Lefevre Gallery, was one of Britain's leading twentieth-century commercial galleries, and survived at 30 Bruton Street, London, until 2002. Although retired from commerce, he remained a prominent figure in European artistic and social circles.

== Personal life ==
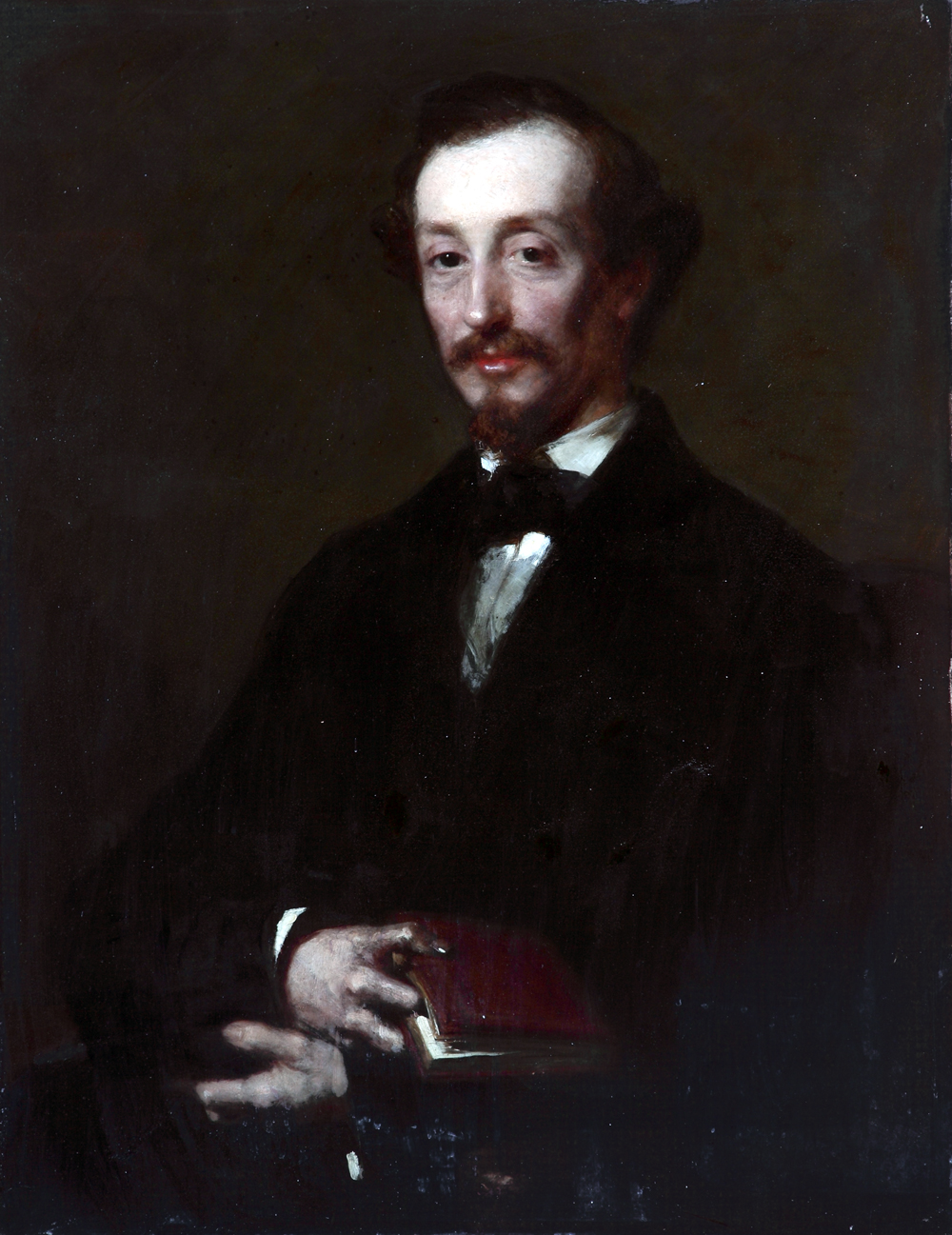
Portrait of Gambart by John Prescott Knight, exhibited 1864. Atkinson Art Gallery

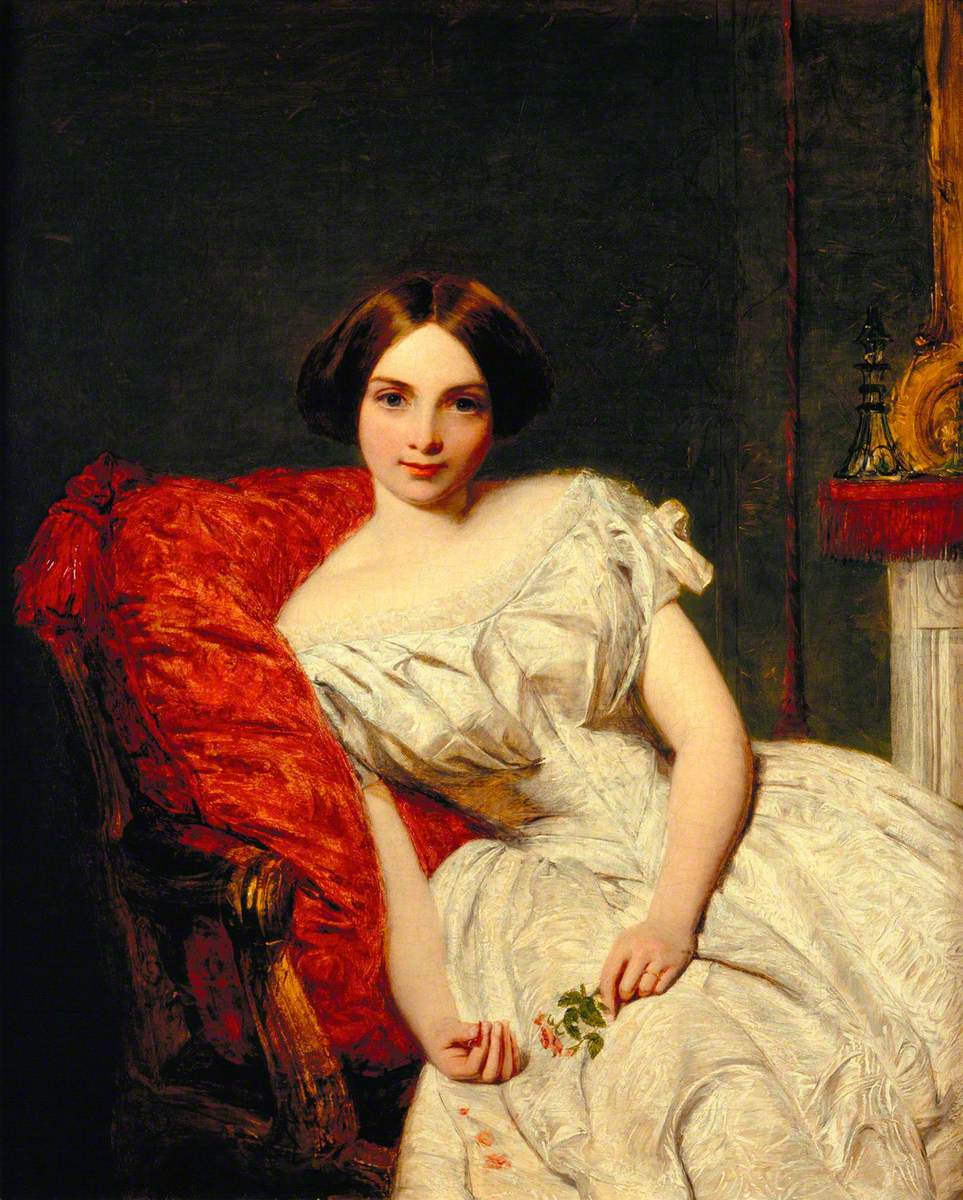
Portrait of Annie Gambart by William Powell Frith, c. 1851, Mercer Art Gallery. Painted at about the time of her marriage to Gambart at the age of 16, she plucks the petals from the flower in her hand, the falling petals symbolising the loss of her virginity.

Gambart was married three times but he had no children. After his move to London he married Anne Codant around 1843 and fathered a daughter, Augustine Eugénie. Mother and daughter died shortly after each other. He later married Mary Matilda (c. 1821–1848), who died from liver disease.

His third wife, Annie née Baines (1835–1870), was 16 years old when he married her in 1851, and he was more than 20 years older than her. He and Annie gave lavish parties at his London home, "Rosenstead" in Avenue Road near Regent's Park, that were the talk of the London scene. Annie was a charming hostess, always expensively dressed, who reportedly behaved with the waywardness of a spoilt child. As one of the first viewers of William Holman Hunt's painting The Scapegoat in 1856, the opinion of Annie and her lady friend was, "it is a peculiar goat, you can see by the ears, they droop so ... Is that the wilderness now? Are you intending to introduce any others of the flock?"

A devastating gas explosion occurred one evening in May 1866 at the time of a fancy-dress ball for Derby Day, after which "nothing was ever quite the same again". The Alma-Tademas, who were staying, awoke to the smell of gas and opened their window, while others hid under the bedclothes. The explosion tore down almost the entire back of the house, and one of the servants died from her injuries. Annie was in such a state of anxiety that Ernest despatched her to friends nearby. Such was the devastation that "the grand piano shot into the road, and even guests flung out of bed and on to the tops of wardrobes," and "a six-foot [picture by] David Roberts was projected over several gardens; and lodged in an apple tree, its branches stuck through the canvas; and two paintings by Creswick were found impaled on a neighbour's iron railings." However, "Gambart only postponed the grand entertainment, and the ball took place about two months afterwards".

In 1867 the couple separated; he allegedly had "various little girls in different lodgings about". Although they never legally divorced, Annie moved to Bayswater, where she remained until she died three years later in 1870, also from liver disease.

He eventually sold Rosenstead to his friend and artist Frederick Goodall, and retired a wealthy man and passed the business on to his nephew, Léon Henri Lefèvre who continued to run it under the name of Pilgeram & Lefèvre. Gambart moved to Nice where he had a marble palace, known as [[Palais de Marbre (Nice)|Les Palmiers]], built to his specifications by the architect Sébastien-Marcel Biasini. The building has housed the Nice Municipal Archives since 1963, and is known as the Palais de Marbre. He served as the Spanish Consul-General in Nice, and accompanied Spanish visitors to the city and met Spanish artists, including José Villegas Cordero and Vicente March y Marco, in their workshops when he visited Rome. His remaining link to his native Belgium was a summer chateau at Spa.

He died in Nice in 1902. The paintings that made up his rich collection were left to the Musée des Beaux-Arts de Nice or dispersed across the globe after his death. By the time of his death, he had become one of the best-known figures in the European art trade.

== Legacy ==
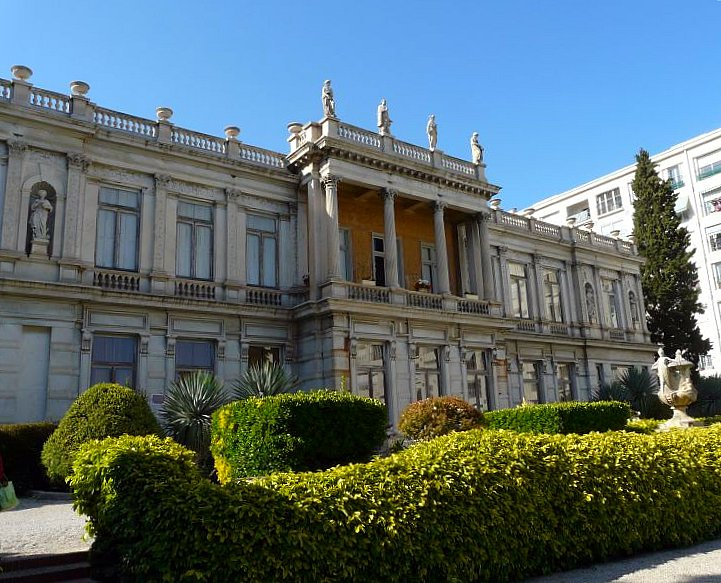
Gambart's home in Nice, called Les Palmiers. It now houses the municipal archives of the city of Nice.

Gambart's influence extended beyond Britain through his international promotion of artists and the widespread circulation of reproductive prints, helping create an international market for contemporary art. Modern scholars regard him as one of the founders of the modern commercial art market. Jeremy Maas described him as the "Prince of the Victorian Art World", and points out that he "really woke up the great British public to the desirability of possessing pictures, or at least engavings." Pamela Fletcher has identified his French Gallery as a decisive stage in the emergence of the commercial dealer-led exhibition system that largely replaced academy-centred marketing during the later nineteenth century,

His importance lay not simply in selling paintings but in developing an international business centred on reproductive prints. His publishing enterprise depended upon acquiring and defending copyright. His 1863 pamphlet formed part of a broader campaign for stronger artistic copyright. His litigation reflected the disruptive impact of photography on the Victorian print trade. His business illustrates how nineteenth-century art dealing combined international commerce with nationally organised legal systems. His career exemplifies the transformation of the art dealer from a merchant into an entrepreneur controlling reproduction rights, publicity and international distribution.

== Honours ==
- Officer of the Legion of Honour (1894)
- Honorary Member of the Royal Victorian Order (1898)
- Avenue Gambart in Nice, a small cul-de-sac off Boulevard de Cambrai and near to Les Palmiers, was named after him

== Sources ==
- Baetens, Jan Dirk (2016). "The General Exhibition of Pictures of 1851: National Schools and International Trade in the Mid-Victorian Art Market". Visual Culture in Britain. 17.
- Baetens, Jan Dirk; Lyna, Dries (2019). "The Education of the Art Market: National Schools and International Trade in the "Long" Nineteenth Century". Art Crossing Borders. The Internationalisation of the Art Market in the Age of Nation States, 1750–1914 (PDF). Studies in the History of Collecting & Art Markets. Vol. 6. Brill. ISBN 978-90-04-29198-0.
- The Burlington Magazine (June 1903). "The Picture Sales". The Burlington Gazette. 1 (3).
- Fletcher, Pamela M. (Spring 2007). "Creating the French Gallery: Ernest Gambart and the Rise of the Commercial Art Gallery in Mid-Victorian London". Nineteenth-Century Art Worldwide. 6 (1).
- Fletcher, Pamela M.; Helmreich, Anne, eds. (2011). The Rise of the Modern Art Market in London: 1850–1939. Manchester University Press. ISBN 978-0719084607.
- Fries Museum (2016). Prettejohn, Elizabeth; Trippi, Peter (eds.). Lawrence Alma-Tadema: At Home in Antiquity. Prestel. ISBN 978-3791355528.
- Gambart, Ernest (1863). On Piracy of Artistic Copyright. London: William Tegg.
- Hugenholtz, P. Bernt; Sherman, Brad; Wiseman, Leanne, eds. (2012). Copyright and the Challenge of the New (PDF). Information Law Series. Vol. 25. The Netherlands: Kluwer Law International BV. ISBN 978-90-411-3669-5.
- Hunt, William Holman (1905). Pre-Raphaelitism and the Pre-Raphaelite Brotherhood. Vol. II. London: Macmillan and Co., Limited.
- Lambourne, Lionel (1999). Victorian Painting. London: Phaidon Press. ISBN 978-0714837765.
- Maas, Jeremy (1975). Gambart, Prince of the Victorian Art World. London: Barrie & Jenkins. ISBN 978-0214201660.
- Marsh, Jan (2005). Dante Gabriel Rossetti: Painter And Poet. Phoenix. ISBN 978-0753818978.
- Martin-Fugier, Anne (2012). La vie d'artiste au XIXe siècle [The Artist's Life in the 19th Century] (in French). Fayard/Pluriel. ISBN 978-2818503225.
- Penot, Agnès (2017). "La maison Goupil et la globalisation du marché de l'art au xixe siècle" [The Goupil Firm and the Globalization of the Art Market in the 19th Century]. In Verger, Jacques (ed.). La forme des réseaux: France et Europe (Xe-XXe siècle) [The Shape of Networks: France and Europe (10th–20th Centuries)] (in French). Paris: Éditions du Comité des travaux historiques et scientifiques. ISBN 978-2-7355-0874-7.
- Sellars, Jane (2006). "Frith's Women: William Powell Frith and the female model". In Bills, Mark; Knight, Vivien (eds.). William Powell Frith: Painting the Victorian Age. Yale University Press. ISBN 9780300125184.
- Storey, George Adolphus (1899). Sketches from Memory. Chatto & Windus.
- Swanson, Vern Grosvenor (1994). "Biography of Sir Lawrence Alma-Tadema". Art Renewal Center. Archived from the original on 26 June 2003.
- Verhoogt, Robert (2019). "Chapter 9: Art Reproduction and the Nation: National Perspectives in an International Art Market". In Baetens, Jan Dirk; Lyna, Dries (eds.). Art Crossing Borders The Internationalisation of the Art Market in the Age of Nation States, 1750-1914 (PDF). Studies in the History of Collecting & Art Markets. Vol. 6. Brill. ISBN 9789004291997.
- de Visser, Evelien (2025). "Book review of "A Thing of Beauty is a Joy Forever": Ernest Gambart (1814–1902), een leven in de kunsthandel (a life in the art trade)". Nineteenth-Century Art Worldwide. 24 (1). Translated by van den Broek, Wendela.
