= He Was Found in the Road =

1952 novel

- Author: Anthony Armstrong
- Language: English
- Genre: Thriller
- Publisher: Methuen
- Publication date: 1952
- Publication place: United Kingdom
- Media type: Print

He Was Found in the Road is a 1952 thriller novel by the British author Anthony Armstrong.

== Film adaptation ==
In 1956 it was adapted into the British film The Man in the Road directed by Lance Comfort and starring Derek Farr, Ella Raines and Donald Wolfit.

== Bibliography ==
- Goble, Alan. The Complete Index to Literary Sources in Film. Walter de Gruyter, 1999.
- Hubin, Allen J. 1981-1985 Supplement to Crime Fiction, 1749-1980. Garland Pub., 1988.
