= The Hunted Slaves =

Painting by Richard Ansdell

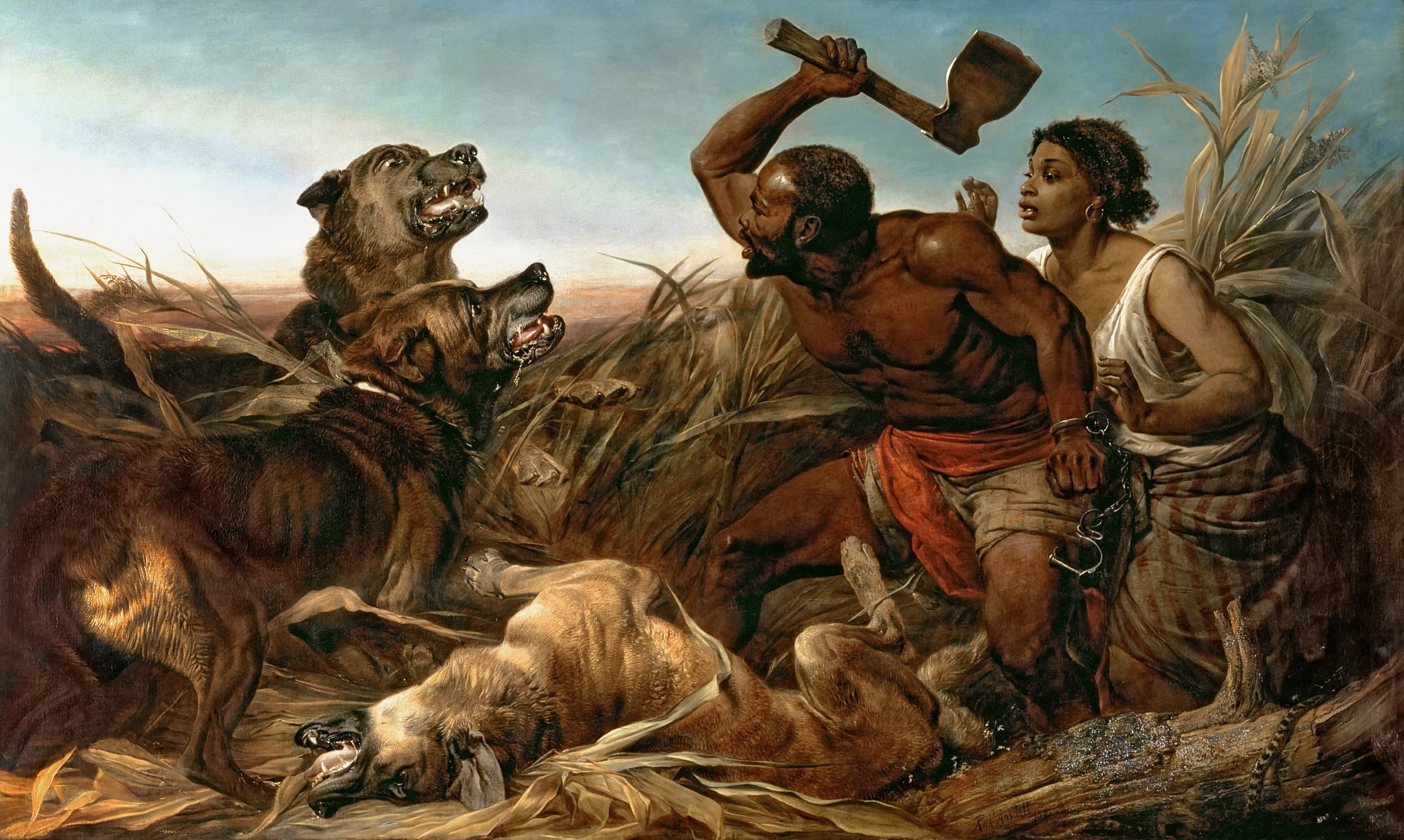
- Artist: Richard Ansdell
- Year: 1861
- Medium: Oil on canvas
- Dimensions: 184 cm × 308 cm (72 in × 121 in)
- Location: International Slavery Museum, Liverpool

The Hunted Slaves is an oil on canvas painting by British artist Richard Ansdell, from 1861. The work is held at the International Slavery Museum, in Liverpool.

== History and description ==
A very dramatic scene, it depicts a couple of runaway African American slaves who are facing down a group of hunting dogs as they flee in a cotton plantation. The man stands in front of the woman and raises an ax to defend himself, while a broken handcuff still hangs on his wrist, evidence of his recent captivity. One of the animals lies wounded on the ground. The dogs are of huge size and appear almost as large as the slaves themselves. The three attack dogs are probably dogues of Cuba.

In the 19th century, fugitive slaves in the Southern United States were often hunted and killed like game. Their owners sent slave hunters and specially trained dogs to track them down. This human hunt was an integral part of the slave system, designed to maintain fear and prevent escape attempts, usually punished with death.

Unlike many depictions of the time, where slaves appeared passive or victims, the current painting shows people who are ready to resist and fight for their freedom. The painting thus belongs to a visual tradition linked to the abolitionist movement. By showing the brutality of the slave hunt but also the determination of the fugitives, the work invites reflection on the cruelty of the slave system.
