= Without Witness (play) =

1933 play

- Original language: English
- Written by: Anthony Armstrong and Harold Simpson
- Genre: Mystery thriller

Premiere
- Date: 27 December 1933
- Place: Embassy Theatre, Swiss Cottage

Without Witness is a mystery thriller play by British authors Anthony Armstrong and Harold Simpson. It premiered at the Embassy Theatre in Swiss Cottage on 27 December 1933, before transferring to the Duke of York's Theatre in London's West End, where it ran for 75 performances between 12 March and 12 June 1934, having been revised slightly from its Embassy premiere. The West End cast included Nicholas Hannen, Arthur Wontner, Bernard Lee, Frederick Piper, Hugh E. Wright, Joan Marion, and Marion Fawcett.

== Synopsis ==
The wife of a brutal, alcoholic businessman is accused of poisoning him and struggles to prove her innocence.
