= Orders Are Orders (play) =

1932 comedy play

- Written by: Ian Hay
- Original language: English
- Genre: Comedy

Premiere
- Date premiered: 1 August 1932
- Place premiered: Kings Theatre, Southsea

Orders Are Orders is a 1932 comedy play by the British writers Ian Hay and Anthony Armstrong. A Hollywood film crew takes over a British Army barracks for a film shoot, with chaotic consequences.

It premiered at the King's Theatre in Southsea, before transferring to the Shaftesbury Theatre in London's West End where it ran for 193 performances from 8 August 1932 to 21 January 1933. The cast included Reginald Purdell, Marjorie Corbett, Kathleen Kelly, Olive Blakeney and Michael Shepley.

== Film adaptations ==
In 1933 it was made into a film Orders Is Orders by Gainsborough Pictures, directed by Walter Forde and starring Charlotte Greenwood, James Gleason and Ian Hunter. In 1955 this was remade into the film Orders Are Orders featuring Peter Sellers, Tony Hancock and Sid James.

== Bibliography ==
- Goble, Alan. The Complete Index to Literary Sources in Film. Walter de Gruyter, 1999.
- Wearing, J.P. The London Stage 1930-1939: A Calendar of Productions, Performers, and Personnel. Rowman & Littlefield, 2014.
