= Rupert Maas =

English painting specialist and gallery owner

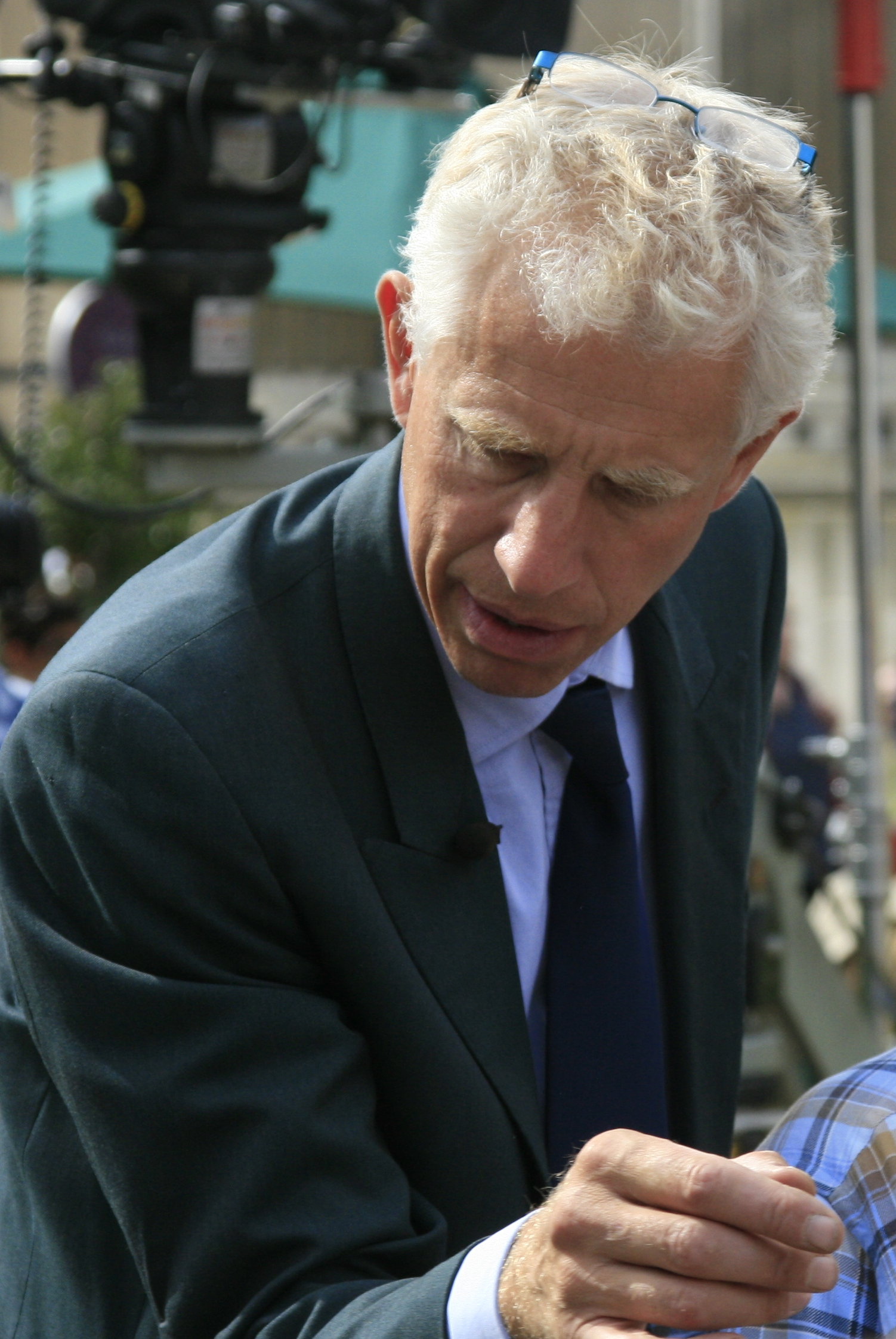
- Maas appearing on Antiques Roadshow in 2010
- Born: Rupert Nicholas Maas; 23 July 1960 (age 66); London, England
- Education: University of Essex (BA)
- Occupations: Art gallery owner, painting specialist on Antiques Roadshow
- Height: 6 ft 6 in (1.98 m)
- Spouse: Tamar Seaborn (m. 1991)
- Children: 3
- Relatives: Jeremy Maas (father); Anthony Armstrong (grandfather)

Rupert Nicholas Maas (born 23 July 1960) is an English painting specialist and gallery owner. He is better known for his appearances on the long-running BBC One series Antiques Roadshow where he has been a member of the team of experts since 1997.

== Biography ==
Born in 1960 and raised in London, Rupert is the middle of three children and the oldest son of the art dealer Jeremy Maas (1928–1997) and artist and equestrian Antonia Armstrong Willis (1932–2017). Rupert has an older sister Athena (born 1957) and a younger brother Jonathan (born 1962).

His father started the Maas Gallery in Mayfair, London, dealing in Pre-Raphaelite paintings, writing a book in 1969, Victorian Painters. Maas was educated at Sherborne School in Dorset from 1974 to 1978 and took a BA in Art History at the University of Essex from 1980 to 1983. In the summer of 1983, he sailed the Atlantic and later that year joined the Maas Gallery which deals in Victorian, Pre-Raphaelite, Romantic and Modern British paintings, watercolours, drawings, reproductive engravings and sculpture. The gallery has also featured the work of a number of contemporary living artists, including Keiron Leach and Julia Sorrell.

Maas served on the executive committee of the Society of London Art Dealers in 1998–99. He co-owns and runs The Watercolours and Drawings Fair. He has regularly written articles for the art, press and lectures on art. He is widely recognised as the leading expert on the works of the Royal Academician Augustus Leopold Egg. He also promotes Ballantine's whisky in the Far East. Maas is frequently called upon to provide independent valuations for museums, both domestic and international, and has previously valued individual pictures and entire collections (for example the John Wharlton Bunney archive) for Acceptance in Lieu. In 2006 Maas was duped into paying £20,000 for a faked art work claimed to be by fairyland painter John Anster Fitzgerald.

In 1993, Maas became full-time director of the Maas Gallery. In 1997, shortly after his father's death, he joined BBC's Antiques Roadshow as a picture specialist. He has appeared regularly on the series and on other television programmes such as Castle in the Country. In 2008, he caused a minor local controversy when, during an episode of Antiques Roadshow, he implied that women from Shropshire had fat ankles.

In December 2015 Maas appeared on the team representing University of Essex on BBC Four's Christmas University Challenge.

== Personal life ==
Maas is 6 ft 6 in (1.98 m) tall. He lives in Camberwell in south London with his wife Tamar. The couple have been married since 1991 and have three daughters.
