= Anthony Armstrong (writer) =

British-Canadian writer (1897–1976)

- Born: 1897
- Died: 1976 (aged 78–79)
- Occupation: Writer

George Anthony Armstrong Willis (1897–1976), known as Anthony Armstrong, was an Anglo-Canadian writer, dramatist and essayist. A humorist who contributed to Punch and The New Yorker magazines, he wrote well-plotted crime plays including Ten Minute Alibi (1933).

== Biography ==
Anthony Armstrong was the son of George Hughlings Armstrong Willis and Adela Emma Temple Frere. Although his parents were both English, he was born in Esquimalt, British Columbia as a consequence of his father's career as a Paymaster Captain in the Royal Navy. They returned to England before his brother's birth in 1900 in Dorset. He was educated at Uppingham School. His brother John Christopher Temple Willis (1900–1969) was Director-General of the Ordnance Survey 1953–1957, and a watercolourist.

During the First World War Willis was commissioned as a 2nd Lieutenant in the Royal Engineers in 1915. He was awarded the Military Cross in 1916.

From 1925 to 1933 Armstrong contributed a weekly column to Punch under the name "A. A."

He married Frances Monica Sealy, and had three children: John Humfrey Armstrong Willis (1928–2012), Antonia Armstrong Willis (1932-2017), and Felicity Armstrong Willis (1936-2008). Antonia married the art expert and gallery owner Jeremy Maas; one of their sons, Rupert, is also an art expert, notable for his appearances on the Antiques Roadshow. Jonathan, another of their sons, is the current intellectual property rights holder for Anthony Armstrong's works and can be reached via his London agents, Eric Glass Ltd.

Armstrong contributed to the screenplay of Alfred Hitchcock's Young and Innocent (1937). Several of his own works were adapted into films including The Strange Case of Mr Pelham, which was made into a first-season episode of Alfred Hitchcock Presents (and directed by Hitchcock), and the film The Man Who Haunted Himself (1970).

== Major works ==
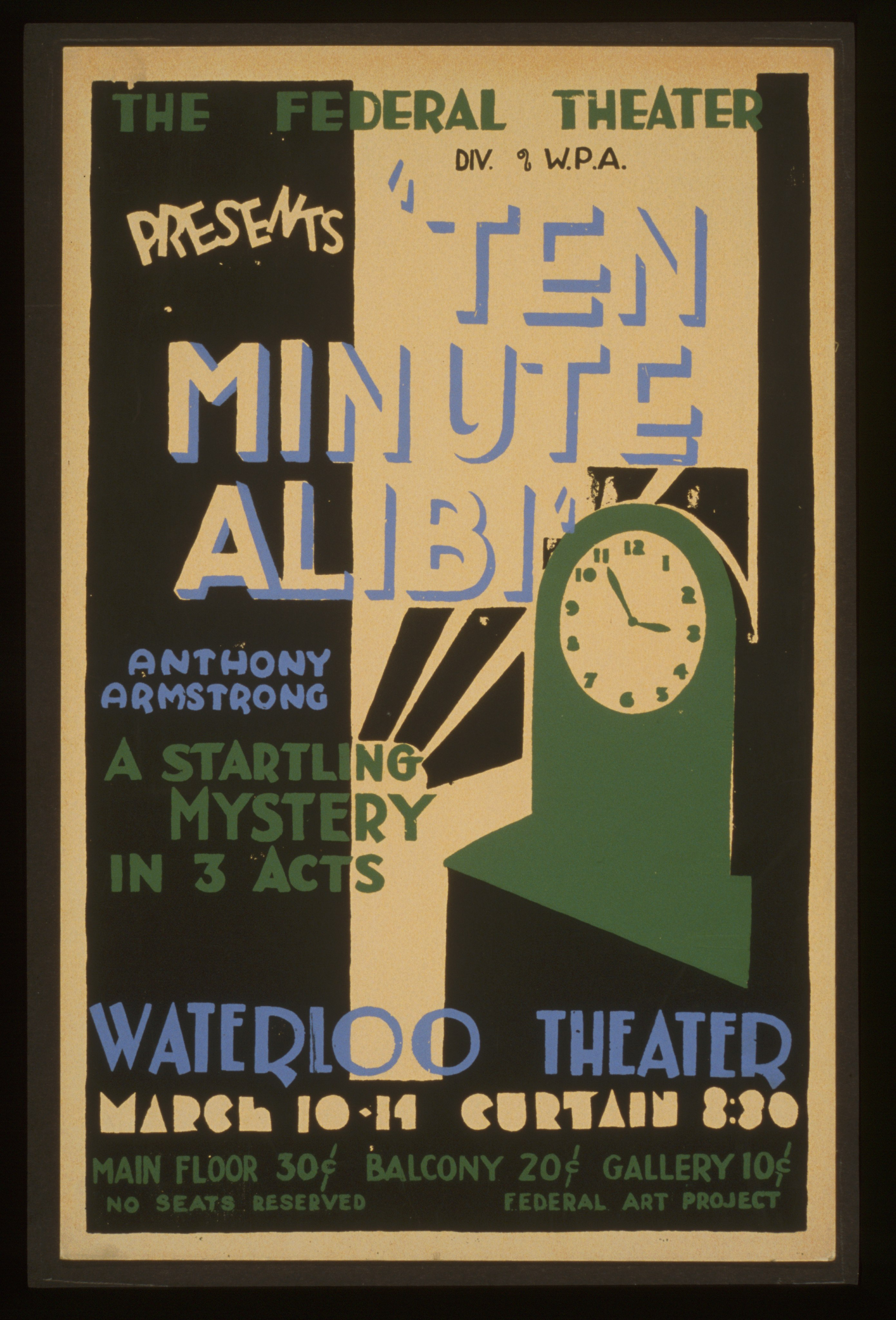
Poster for a Federal Theatre Project production of Anthony Armstrong's Ten Minute Alibi in Waterloo, Iowa (1936)

=== Novels ===
- Lure of the Past (1920)
- The Love of Prince Raameses (1921)
- The Wine of Death: A Tale of the Lost Long-Ago (1925)
- Patrick, Undergraduate (1926)
- Jimmie Rezaire (1927)
- The Secret Trail (1928)
- The Trail of the Lotto (1929)
- The Trail of the Black King (1931)
- The Poison Trail (1932)
- Britisher on Broadway (1932)
- Easy Warriors (1932)
- Ten Minute Alibi (1934) – novelization of his play, adapted as a 1935 film
- Without Witness (1934)
- Cottage into House (1936)
- The End of the Road (1943)
- When the Bells Rang: A Tale of What Might Have Been (1943)
- No Higher Mountain (1951)
- He Was Found in the Road (1952) – adapted as the 1956 film The Man in the Road
- Spies in Amber (1956)
- The Strange Case of Mr. Pelham (1957) – adapted as the 1970 film The Man Who Haunted Himself
- One Jump Ahead (1973)

=== Short story collections ===
- Apple and Percival (1931), humorous stories about Apple and his friend Percival.
- The Prince Who Hiccupped and Other Tales: Being Some Fairy Tales for Grownups (1932)
- The Pack of Pieces (1942) – more fairy tales for adults

=== Plays ===
- In the Dentist's Chair (1931)
- Orders Are Orders (1932)
- The Eleventh Hour (1933)
- Ten Minute Alibi (1933)
- Without Witness (1933)
- Mile-Away Murder (1937)
- Here We Come Gathering (1951)
