= Liprandi =

Liprandi is a surname. Notable people with the surname include:

- Ivan Petrovich Liprandi (1790–1880), Russian major general, historian, and chief of the secret police
- Pavel Liprandi (1796–1864), Russian soldier who took part in the Crimean War
