= Ivan Liprandi =

Russian general (1790–1880)

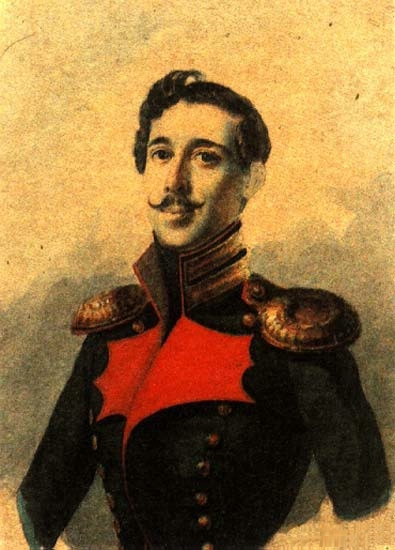
Ivan Petrovich Liprandi

Ivan Petrovich Liprandi (Иван Петрович Липранди, Giovanni Pietro de Liprandi; 28 July [O.S. 17 July] 1790 – 21 May [O.S. 9 May] 1880) was a Russian secret service officer, major general, and memoirist of Spanish and Italian descent. He was the elder brother of Pavel Liprandi.

His father Pietro headed Russia's arms factories and organised those of Tsar Alexander, before returning from Russia to his native Piedmont. During the Finnish War and Napoleonic Wars, Ivan built a reputation as a remarkable duelist and Freemason. After the taking of Paris in 1814, he became interested in secret police methods and did some fieldwork with Vidocq.

In the early 1820s, Liprandi served in Odessa under Prince Vorontsov, helping infiltrate the Danubian Principalities with Russian spies. During this sojourn in New Russia, he saw Pushkin on a daily basis and was on friendly terms with him. The writer depicted him as Silvio in The Shot, an 1830 short story inspired by an anecdote told by Liprandi.

After the Decembrist Revolt, Liprandi was briefly arrested and had to leave military service (although some Decembrists considered him a government spy). He went on to serve as an 'official for special assignments', first for the Minister of Internal Affairs (from 1840), and then at the Government Office (from 1856).

Liprandi played a prominent role in the suppression of the so-called Petrashevsky Circle. On behalf of Minister of Interior Lev Perovski, he observed the circle for a year and on 20 April 1849 gave the names of four people more or less involved in it, all of whom were arrested. The Commission of Inquiry invited Liprandi to express his opinion about the case, provided they noted that, in his own words, he had contributed to the guilty verdict against the four.

In the early 1850s, Liprandi was asked to look into supposedly seditious activities of the Old Believers. After a prolonged study of different sects, Liprandi concluded that they were essentially harmless.

In his later years, Liprandi wrote a history of Napoleon's Russian campaign, tracked down the surviving veterans of this war and provided some important materials for the novel War and Peace. (Leo Tolstoy sent him an inscribed copy of the first edition). His memoirs have been highly praised as the most detailed source of information about Pushkin's southern exile.

== Main works ==
- Brief Review of the Patriotic War, from August 17 until September 2 (St. Petersburg, 1858);
- The Battle of Borodino (1861);
- The Eastern Question and Bulgaria (Wiley, 1868);
- Bulgaria (1877);
- Looking at the theatre of war on the Danube, etc. (1878).
- Numerous articles (on topics including the Old Believers) published in Russkaya Starina and Bartenev's Russian Archive.

== Sources ==
- (in Russian) Article on Liprandi
- Rogachev AB Liprandi Ivan Petrovich / / Russian writers, 1800–1917: Biographical Dictionary. М., 1994. M., 1994. Т. 3. T. 3. С. 362—364. S. 362–364.
- Victor Taki, "From partisan war to the ethnography of European Turkey: the Balkan career of Ivan Liprandi, 1790–1880," Canadian Slavonic Papers 58. no 3 (2016)

This article incorporates text from the Eleventh Encyclopædia Britannica (1890–1907).
