= Pavel Liprandi =

Russian general (1796–1864)

- Born: 15 January 1796; Russian Empire
- Died: 27 August 1864 (aged 68); Saint Petersburg, Russian Empire
- Military career
- Allegiance: Russian Empire
- Branch: Imperial Russian Army
- Service years: 1812–1864
- Rank: General of the infantry
- Conflicts: Napoleonic Wars; Russo-Turkish War; November Uprising; Hungarian Campaign; Crimean War; Battle of Balaclava (WIA); Charge of the Light Brigade
- Awards: Order of St. Vladimir; Order of St. George; Order of Saint Stanislaus; Order of the White Eagle

General Pavel Petrovich Liprandi (Russian: Павел Петрович Липранди, pronounced [ˈpavʲɪl pʲɪˈtrovʲɪtɕ lʲɪˈpranʲdʲɪ]; 15 January 1796 – 27 August 1864) was a Russian military officer of Spanish-Italian descent who participated in the Crimean War.

== Life ==
=== Napoleonic Wars and postwar ===
On the French invasion of Russia in 1812, he unsuccessfully tried to enter the Akhtyrsky Hussars, but had to satisfy himself with being a volunteer on the staff of 6 Corps (commanded by Dmitry Dokhturov), in which his brother Ivan Petrovich was serving as chief quartermaster. Pavel fought with the corps in the battles of Tarutino, Maloyaroslavets and Krasnoi. Due to this experience was made a sub-ensign in the Pskov Musketeer Regiment in 1813, with which he participated in the pursuit of Napoleon's army back across Germany and into France, fighting at Katzbach, after which he was promoted to ensign, Dresden, Brienne, La Rothière, Laffert-sous-Zhoar (for which was made a second lieutenant), Montmirail, Chateau-Thierry, Méré, Craonne, Laon, Soissons and the capture of Paris.

In 1816 Liprandi was appointed adjutant to General Fedor Talyzin, head of the 16th Division; in 1818 (already at the rank of captain) he was transferred to the Life Guards Grenadier Regiment. In 1822 he was transferred to the general staff, with his appointment as adjutant to the corps commander General Ivan Sabaneyev, with whom he soon became friends and through whom he became known to Count Mikhail Semyonovich Vorontsov and Pavel Kiselyov. Close interaction with these commanders had a great influence on Liprandi, as was to become manifest later, when he took command himself.

=== Russo-Turkish War and November Uprising ===
Before the Russo-Turkish War of 1828–29, as adjutant and chief of staff to General Kiselev, Liprandi was ordered to the fortress of Isaccea Pasha to deliver the Russian declaration of war, with a secret commission to examine the fortress and find out if the Turks had intelligence of the Russian army's movements. Brilliantly fulfilling this assignment, he was sent to Galaţi in order to find out whether there were suitable vessels for the transport of troops in the planned expedition to Isaccea, another mission he successfully executed. In May 1828 Liprandi participated in the siege and occupation of the fortress of Brailov and, after the Russian troops crossed the Danube, he was sent to General Aleksandr Rudzevich with orders to capture Isaccea and the road to Brailov, Babadag and Tulcea. On 8 July he participated in the Battle of Shumen and for his conduct there was awarded the Order of St. Vladimir, 4th degree with bow. In 1829, as a lieutenant-colonel, Liprandi was given a secret order to observe everything that took place in the Austrian Empire and to go the border of Moldova and there gather as accurate information as possible on the Austrians' plans. In 1830 he was put in charge of the Satunovskiy Quarantine, and on the outbreak of cholera in the Novorossiysk region was appointed chief commander of the fortress of Kinburn and Ochakov.

Liprandi commanded the Eletski Infantry Regiment, which participated in the war against the November Uprising in Poland, being first in the unit of General Theodor von Rüdiger for operations against Józef Dwernicki, then fighting at the siege of the fortress at Zamość, where he fought with distinction and was made a colonel. He then fought in the storming of Warsaw's fortifications, where he commanded 1st Brigade 2nd Infantry. When Baron Teodor Geismar was shot, Liprandi replaced him as commander of the entire assault column and was the first to ascend the ramparts of fortifications 54 and 22, for which he was awarded the Order of St. George 3rd degree number 453, with the citation "in reward for the courage and bravery shown on 25 and 26 August 1831 in the storming of the fortifications of Warsaw". After the conquest of Warsaw, he joined the vanguard of Lieutenant-General Vladimir Sievers, pursued the retreating Polish rebels to Lublin and participated in the siege of the fortress at Lublin.

=== Military reform ===
At the end of hostilities Liprandi proceeded to implement reforms he had already started beforehand to improve soldiers' living conditions, which he developed with generals Sabaneev, Kiselev and Vorontsov. After two years the Eletskii Regiment became so outstanding in its performance that on 28 January Liprandi was appointed aide-de-camp to the Tsar, and in 1835 was granted estates in the Polish kingdom . On 26 March 1839 Liprandi was promoted to major general and given command of the King Frederick William III Grenadier Regiment (later known as the St. Petersburg Life Guard Regiment Life Guards of St. Petersburg) and in 1842 was appointed commander of the Semenov Life Guards Regiment. In 1844 he was granted the Order of Saint Stanislaus 1st class. Still concerned with improving the soldiers' living conditions, Liprandi created the role of special instruction company commander of a contentment company (later adopted by the leadership in all parts of the lifeguards), built a pumping tower with a filter for the regiment by the side of the Kryukov Canal and so improved the regiment's financial state that he could refuse sending soldiers to voluntary work. Throughout his 17 years commanding various regiments, Liprandi never arrested an officer or private unless he was condemned to corporal punishment, proving that the harsh methods of command more common at that time were prejudiced. In 1848 Liprandi was promoted to lieutenant general, appointed Chief of Staff of the Grenadier Corps and admitted to the Guards Corps, the General Staff and the lists of the Life Guards Semenov regiment.

=== Hungarian Revolution and Crimean War ===
With the announcement in 1849 of the military campaign in Hungary, Ivan Paskevich's proposal that Liprandi command the 12th Infantry Division was approved, and in the Crimean War Liprandi was appointed head of the Little Valahskiy unit, to cover the right flank of the Southern Army and protect Lesser Wallachia. Chepurchei Liprandi drove the Turks from Calafat, and received the Order of the White Eagle, with swords. From Bessarabia Liprandi's division moved to the Crimea. Emperor Nicholas I recommended Liprandi as commander in chief in the following terms: "To General Liprandi, can instruct a separate unit, and it can be safely relied upon, as an experienced general." Liprandi was not slow in justifying this recommendation. He commanded the army at the Battle of Balaklava, during which he was wounded by grenade shrapnel in the leg, but remained on the field. Liprandi went on to take part in the battles at Inkerman, and at the Chernaya.

=== Later life and death ===
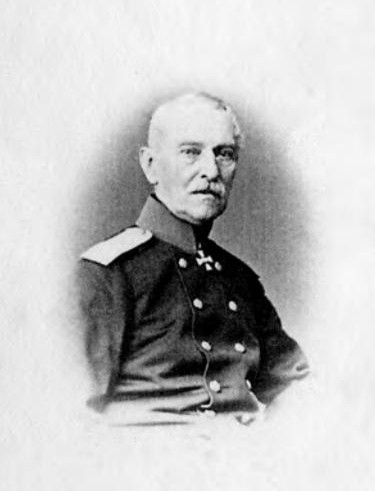
Liprandi in the 1860s

In 1855 Liprandi was in command of 6th Infantry Corps, but in 1856 he took indefinite leave. Having in 1858 inherited the village of Efimievo, Nizhny Novgorod province, and becoming a landowner, Liprandi immediately released his peasants. By 1859, at the personal request of Emperor Alexander II, Liprandi took command of 2nd Infantry Corps, located in the Kingdom of Poland, but in 1861, due to a disagreement with the Viceroy of Poland, Karl Lambert, he was instead appointed a member of the Military Council, and in 1862 Inspector of troops.

He died in 1864 and is buried in St. Petersburg at the Mitrofaniyevskoe cemetery.

== Family ==
Liprandi married Maria Fedorovna Talyzina (1808–1843) in 1833. She was the daughter of Lieutenant General F. I. Talyzin. Their son, Rafail Pavlovich (1838-1909) was a Major General of the General Staff. He fought with distinction in the Russo-Turkish War (1877–1878), including at the Battle of Shipka Pass, for which he was awarded gold weapons and the Order of St. George 4th class.
