= Battle of Omdurman =

1898 battle of the Mahdist War

- Part of the Anglo-Egyptian conquest of Sudan during the Mahdist War
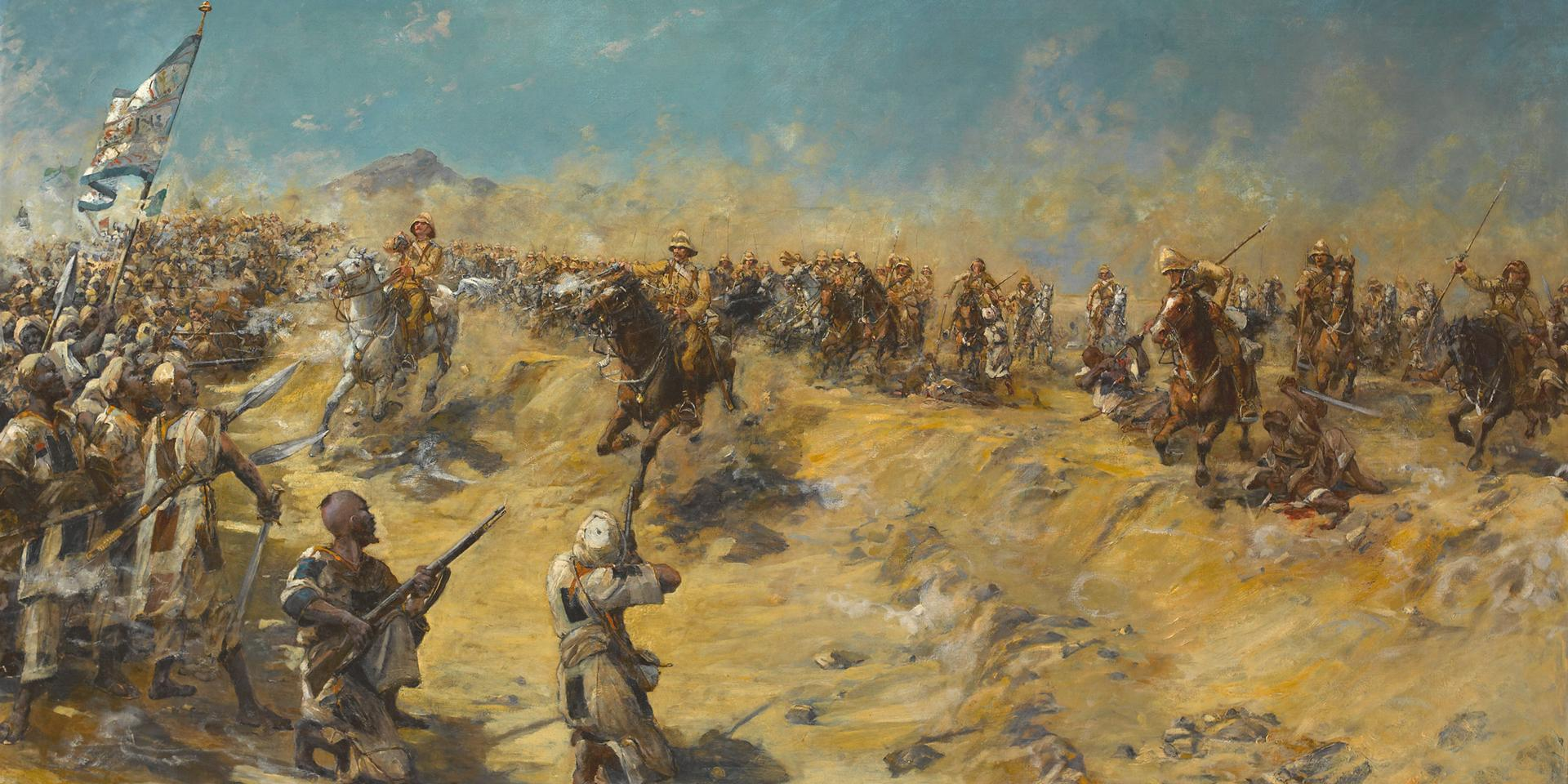
- Charge of the 21st Lancers at Omdurman, 2 September 1898; Edward Matthew Hale, 1899 (Note: This illustration of the charge of the 21st Lancers at the Battle of Omdurman was produced for Sir Evelyn Wood’s 1915 edition of British Battles on Land and Sea. "As they rode over the low ridge, the lancers were surprised by the thousands of Sudanese soldiers concealed behind it.”)
Date	2 September 1898
Location	Omdurman, Khartoum, Sudan 15°45′07″N 32°31′12″E
Result	British–Egyptian victory

Belligerents
United Kingdom; Khedivate of Egypt	Mahdist State

Commanders and leaders
(United Kingdom of Great Britain and Ireland) Herbert Kitchener; (United Kingdom of Great Britain and Ireland) Hector MacDonald	(Mahdist State) Abdallahi ibn Muhammad

Strength
8,200 British, 17,600 Egyptians and Sudanese Total: 25,800	35,000–50,000

Casualties and losses
47–48 dead 382 wounded	12,000 killed 13,000 wounded 5,000 captured

The Battle of Omdurman, also known as the Battle of Karary, was fought during the Anglo-Egyptian conquest of Sudan between a British–Egyptian expeditionary force commanded by British Commander-in-Chief (sirdar) major general Horatio Herbert Kitchener and a Sudanese army of the Mahdist State, led by Abdallahi ibn Muhammad (the Khalifa), the successor to the self-proclaimed Mahdi, Muhammad Ahmad. The battle took place on 2 September 1898, at Kerreri, 11 kilometres (6.8 mi) north of Omdurman.

Following the establishment of the Mahdist State in Sudan, and the subsequent threat to the regional status quo and to British-occupied Egypt, the British government decided to send an expeditionary force with the task of overthrowing the Khalifa. The commander of the force, Sir Herbert Kitchener, was also seeking revenge for the death of General Gordon, who had been killed when a Mahdist army captured Khartoum thirteen years earlier. On the morning of 2 September, some 35,000–50,000 Sudanese tribesmen under Abdullah attacked the British lines in a disastrous series of charges; later that morning the 21st Lancers charged and defeated another force that appeared on the British right flank. Among those present was 23-year-old soldier and reporter Winston Churchill as well as a young Captain Douglas Haig.

The victory of the British–Egyptian force was a demonstration of the superiority of a highly disciplined army equipped with modern rifles, machine guns, and artillery over a force twice its size armed with older weapons, and marked the success of British efforts to reconquer Sudan. Following the Battle of Umm Diwaykarat a year later, the remaining Mahdist forces were defeated and Anglo-Egyptian Sudan was established.

== Background ==
On 13 September 1882, the British established their control over Egypt following the Battle of Tel el Kebir. In 1883 Muhammad Ahmad ibn as-Sayyid Abd Allah who called himself the Mahdi appeared in Sudan followed by thousands of Islamic warriors known to the Europeans as Dervishes and to the Mahdists as the Ansār. At El Obeid on 3 November 1883, an Egyptian force under General William Hicks, sent by the Egyptian government to put down the uprising, was defeated by the Mahdi's army during the Battle of Shaykan. Another force, this time sent by the British government, and led by Major General Charles Gordon proceeded to Khartoum where it was besieged by the Mahdists. On 26 January 1885, the Dervishes overcame Gordon's troops and massacred the entire garrison. After the Mahdi died in 1885, Abdallahi ibn Muhammad known as Khalifa 'Abdullahi' became the new ruler. The Mahdist state, the Mahdia, built on slavery and holy war, enforced a strict Islamic code imposing a reign of terror over the regions of Sudan.

In 1896 to protect British interests, in particular the Suez Canal, and to suppress the slave trade, the British government decided to reconquer Sudan. An Anglo-Egyptian army under British Commander-in-Chief of Egyptian Army Major General (Note: Colonel in the British Army) Herbert Kitchener marched south from Egypt. Kitchener captured Dongola on 21 September 1896, and Abu Hamed on 7 August 1897. At the Battle of the Atbara River on 7 April 1898, he defeated Mahdist forces led by Osman Dinga and Khalifa Abdullah, opening a line of march up the Nile. On 1 September 1898 Kitchener, supported by a powerful flotilla of gunboats, arrived to face the main Mahdist army at Omdurman, near Khartoum.

== Battle ==
The battle took place at Karary, 11 kilometres (6.8 mi) north of Omdurman. (Note: The village of Omdurman was chosen in 1884 as the base of operations by the Mahdi, Muhammad Ahmad. After his death in 1885, following the successful siege of Khartoum, his successor (Khalifa) Abdullah retained it as his capital. Following the battle Omdurman was occupied under a joint Anglo-Egyptian condominium, which lasted until 1956. Omdurman is today a suburb of Khartoum in central Sudan, with a population of some 2 million.) Kitchener commanded a force of 8,000 British regulars and a mixed force of 17,000 Sudanese and Egyptian troops. He arrayed his force in an arc around the village of Egeiga, close to the bank of the Nile, where a twelve gunboat flotilla waited in support, facing a wide, flat plain with hills rising to the left and right. The British and Egyptian cavalry were placed on either flank.

Abdullah's followers numbered around 50,000, including some 3,000 cavalry. They were split into five groups—a force of 8,000 under Osman Azrak was arrayed directly opposite the British, in a shallow arc along a mile (1.6 km) of a low ridge leading onto the plain, and the other Mahdist forces were initially concealed from Kitchener's force. Abdullah al-Taashi and 17,000 men were concealed behind Surkab Hill (in older sources often distorted to "Surgham" Hill) to the west and rear of Osman Azrak's force, with 20,000 more positioned to the north-west, close to the front behind the Kerreri hills, commanded by Ali wad Hilu and Osman Sheikh ed-Din. A final force of around 8,000 was gathered on the slope on the right flank of Azrak's force.

The battle began in the early morning, at around 6:00 a.m. After the clashes of the previous day, the 8,000 men under Osman Azrak advanced straight at the waiting British, quickly followed by about 8,000 of those waiting to the northwest, a mixed force of rifle and spear-men. The 52 quick firing guns of the British artillery opened fire at around 2,750 metres (1.71 mi), inflicting severe casualties on the Mahdist forces before they even came within range of the Maxim guns and volley fire. The frontal attack ended quickly, with around 4,000 Mahdist forces casualties; none of the attackers got closer than 50 m to the British trenches. A flanking move from the Ansar right was also checked, and there were bloody clashes on the opposite flank that scattered the Mahdist forces there.

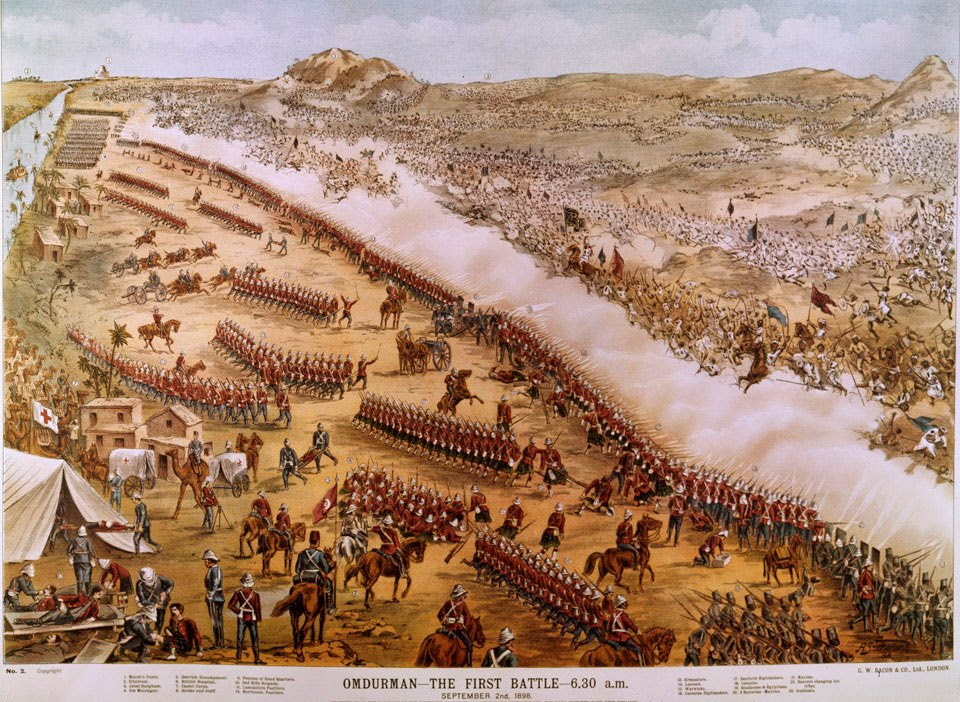
The second of four lithographs of the battle by A. Sutherland, showing the situation at 6.30 a.m. National Army Museum

While the Anglo–Egyptian infantry were able to make use of their superior firepower from behind a zariba barricade without suffering significant casualties, the cavalry and camel corps deployed to the centre-north of the main force found themselves under threat from the Mahdist Green Standard force of about 15,000 warriors. Lieutenant Colonel Robert Broadwood, the commander of the Anglo-Egyptian mounted troops, used his cavalry to draw off part of the advancing Ansar attackers under Osman Digna, but the slower-moving camel troops, attempting to regain the protection of the zariba, found themselves being closely pursued by Green Standard horsemen. This marked a crucial stage of the battle, but Kitchener was able to deploy two gunboats to a position on the river where their cannon and Nordenfelt guns broke up the Mahdist force before it could destroy Broadwood's detachment and possibly penetrate the flank of the Anglo-Egyptian infantry.

Kitchener was anxious to occupy Omdurman before the remaining Mahdist forces could withdraw there. He advanced his army on the city, arranging them in separate columns for the attack. The British light cavalry regiment, the 21st Lancers, was sent ahead to clear the plain to Omdurman. They had a tough time of it. In what has been described as the last operational cavalry charge by British troops, and the largest since the Crimean War, the 400-strong regiment attacked what they thought were only a few hundred dervishes, but in fact there were 2,500 infantry hidden behind them in a depression. After a fierce clash, the Lancers drove them back (resulting in three Victoria Crosses being awarded to Lancers who helped rescue wounded comrades). One of the participants of this fight was Lieutenant Winston Churchill, commanding a troop of twenty-five lancers. (Note: Churchill later wrote a two-volume account of the campaign titled The River War.) On a larger scale, the British advance allowed the Khalifa to re-organize his forces. He still had over 30,000 men in the field and directed his main reserve to attack from the west while ordering the forces to the northwest to attack simultaneously over the Kerreri Hills.

Kitchener's force wheeled left in echelon to advance up Surkab ridge and then southwards. To protect the rear, a brigade of 3,000 mainly Sudanese, commanded by Hector MacDonald, was reinforced with Maxims and artillery and followed the main force at around 1,350 metres (0.84 mi). Curiously, the supplies and wounded around Egeiga were left almost unprotected.

MacDonald was alerted to the presence of around 15,000 enemy troops moving towards him from the west, out from behind Surkab. He wheeled his force and lined them up to face the enemy charge. The Mahdist infantry attacked in two prongs. Lewis's Egyptian Brigade managed to hold its own, but MacDonald was forced to repeatedly re-order his battalions. The brigade maintained a punishing fire. Kitchener, now aware of the problem, "began to throw his brigades about as if they were companies". MacDonald's brigade was soon reinforced with flank support and more Maxim guns and the Mahdist forces were forced back; they finally broke and fled, or died where they stood. The Mahdist forces to the north had regrouped too late and entered the clash only after the force in the central valley had been routed. They pressed Macdonald's Sudanese brigades hard, but Wauchope's brigade with the Lincolnshire Regiment was quickly brought up and with sustained section volleys repulsed the advance. A final desperate cavalry charge of around 500 Mahdist horsemen was utterly destroyed. The march on Omdurman was resumed at about 11:30.

== Awards ==
Four awards were made of the Victoria Cross, all for gallantry shown on 2 September 1898.

- Thomas Byrne, Private, 21st Lancers
- Raymond de Montmorency, Lieutenant, 21st Lancers
- Paul Aloysius Kenna, Captain, 21st Lancers
- Nevill Smyth, Captain, 2nd Dragoon Guards (Queen's Bays), attached to the Egyptian Army.

Queen's Sudan Medal, British campaign medal awarded to British and Egyptian forces which took part in the Sudan campaign between 1896 and 1898.

Khedive's Sudan Medal (1897), Egyptian campaign medal awarded to British and Egyptian forces which took part in the Sudan campaign between 1896 and 1898.

== Aftermath ==
Around 12,000 of the Mahdists were killed, 13,000 wounded and 5,000 taken prisoner. Kitchener's force lost 47 men killed and 382 wounded, the majority from MacDonald's command. One eyewitness described the appalling scene:

They could never get near and they refused to hold back. ... It was not a battle but an execution. ... The bodies were not in heaps—bodies hardly ever are; but they spread evenly over acres and acres. Some lay very composedly with their slippers placed under their heads for a last pillow; some knelt, cut short in the middle of a last prayer. Others were torn to pieces ...

— Ellis 1981, p. 86

The battle was the first time that the Mark IV hollow point bullet, made in the arsenal in Dum Dum, was used in a major battle. It was an expanding bullet, and the units that used it considered them to be highly effective.

Controversy over the killing of the wounded after the battle began soon afterwards. The debate was ignited by a highly critical article published by Ernest Bennett (present at the battle as a journalist) in the Contemporary Review, which evoked a fierce riposte and defence of Kitchener by Bennet Burleigh (another journalist also present at the battle). Winston Churchill privately agreed with Bennett that Kitchener was too brutal in his killing of the wounded. This opinion was reflected in his own account of the battle when it was first published in 1899. However, mindful of the effect that patriotic public opinion could have on his political career, Churchill significantly moderated criticism of Kitchener in his book's second edition in 1902. The Khalifa, Abdullah al-Taashi, escaped and survived until 1899, when he was killed in the Battle of Umm Diwaykarat. Several days after the battle, Kitchener was sent to Fashoda, due to the developing Fashoda Incident. Kitchener was ennobled as a baron, Kitchener of Khartoum, for his victory.

Churchill published his account of the battle in 1899 as The River War: An Account of the Reconquest of the Soudan. Present as a war correspondent for The Times was Colonel Frank Rhodes, brother of Cecil, who was shot and severely wounded in the right arm. For his services during that battle he was restored to the army active list.

The Battle of Omdurman has also lent its name to many streets in British and Commonwealth cities, for example 'Omdurman Road' in Southampton and 'Omdurman Street' in Freshwater, Sydney, Australia.

== Cultural depictions ==
=== Contemporary responses ===
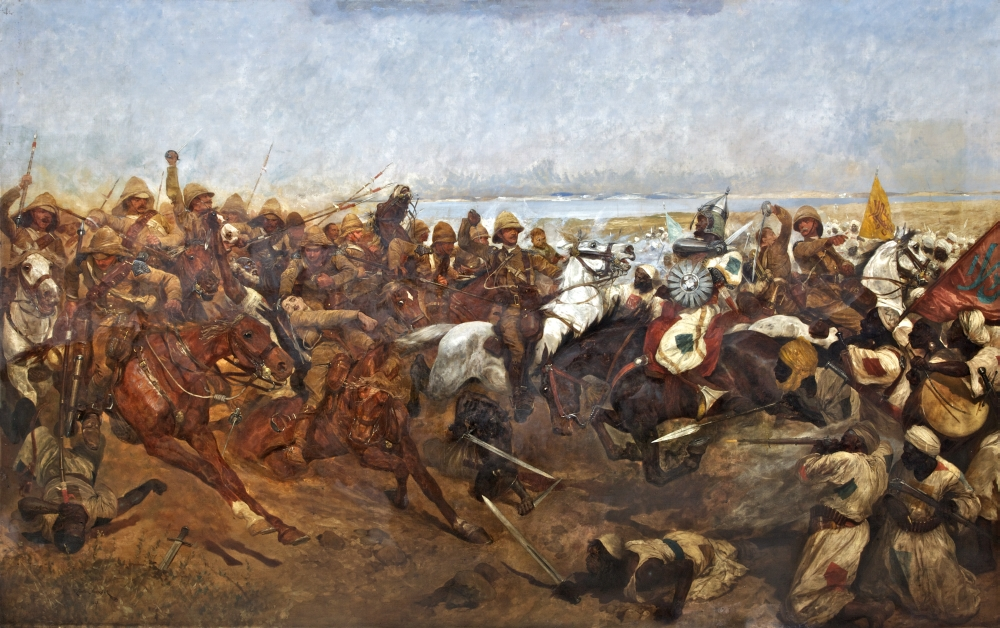
"The Charge of the 21st Lancers at Omdurman", by Richard C. Woodville

The subject of the battle made its appearance in several oil paintings later exhibited in Britain. In particular, the charge of the 21st Lancers held special appeal and several artists portrayed the scene including Stanley Berkeley, Robert Alexander Hillingford, Richard Caton Woodville, William Barnes Wollen, Gilbert S. Wright, Edward Mathew Hale, Capt. Adrian Jones, Major John C. Mathews, and Allan Stewart. The pictorial press covered the campaign extensively and employed several artists to record the events.

Although some among the press corps accompanying the army had film cameras, no footage was shot of the actual fighting. What was passed off as films of the battle, or preparations for it, were in fact spliced footage of barracks training or troop movements far from the front. Such films maintained their popularity for months in Britain and were succeeded by short features such as the fictional How Tommy Won the Victoria Cross: an Incident of the Soudan War (1899) in which English soldiers survive a 'dervish' ambush.

The victory, and especially the cavalry charge of the 21st Lancers, was soon celebrated by songs on the popular stage, including "What Will They Say in England? A Story of the Gallant 21st" by Orlando Powell (1867–1915) and Léonard Gautier's "The Heroic Charge of the 21st Lancers at the Battle of Omdurman", published complete with piano score (London: E. Donajowski, 1898). William McGonagall was also among those inspired to doggerel patriotism in a hastily produced broadside, "The battle of Omdurman: a new poem: composed September 1898", soon to be joined by the equally spontaneous verse of Henry Surtees, one of the uniformed participants, in his The March to Khartoum and Fall of Omdurman (1899). In the following year there appeared a more polished performance in Annie Moore's poetry collection, Omdurman and other verses.

In Sudan itself, the Khalifa had poets among his entourage, not all of whom were killed in the fighting, but much of their work was either destroyed by the British during systematic searches after the battle, or even by the poets themselves in fear of reprisal. Nevertheless, as part of the oral tradition there survived a lamentation by Wad Sa’d, who was an eye-witness of the defeat.

=== Later fiction ===
It was not long before a fictional account of the British military expedition appeared in G.A. Henty's series of adventure stories for boys. It was titled With Kitchener in the Soudan (1903) and included a description of the battle in chapter 14. It was also depicted in the climax of the 1939 film The Four Feathers and later as a short episode in the 1972 film Young Winston, where Churchill takes part in the charge of the 21st Lancers. About that period too, Lance Corporal Jones mentions his own participation in the battle during the comedy series Dad's Army.

The battle was later made an incident in a few 21st century novels. The Triumph of the Sun (2005) by Wilbur Smith concentrates mainly on the siege of Khartoum and the fate of the defeated, but carries the story through to Kitchener's campaign. The 2008 novel After Omdurman by John Ferry is also partly set during the 1898 re-conquest of Sudan, with the book's lead character, Evelyn Winters, playing a peripheral role in the fighting. The main focus of Jake Arnott's The Devil's Paintbrush (2009) is the life of Hector MacDonald but also includes the battle and Kitchener's railway-building drive through Sudan.

== See also ==
- Anglo-Egyptian conquest of Sudan
