= Raymond de Montmorency =

Recipient of the Victoria Cross

The Honourable Raymond de Montmorency VC
- Born: 5 February 1867; Montreal, Quebec, Canada
- Died: 23 February 1900 (aged 33); Dordrecht, Cape Colony, South Africa
- Burial place: Molteno Cemetery, near Dordrecht
- Military career
- Allegiance: United Kingdom
- Branch: British Army
- Service years: 1887–1900
- Rank: Captain
- Units: Lincolnshire Regiment; 21st Lancers
- Conflicts: Mahdist War; Second Boer War †
- Awards: Victoria Cross

Raymond Harvey Lodge Joseph de Montmorency VC (5 February 1867 – 23 February 1900) was a Canadian recipient of the Victoria Cross (VC), the highest and most prestigious award for gallantry in the face of the enemy that can be awarded to British and Commonwealth forces. (Also considered a Canadian recipient due to his place of birth).

== Early life career ==
De Montmorency was born in Montreal, Quebec, Canada, the eldest son and heir of Major-General Reymond de Montmorency, 3rd Viscount Frankfort de Montmorency, Irish representative peer, who served in the Crimean War, the Indian Rebellion, Abyssinia and the Mahdist War, and his wife Rachel Mary Lumley Godolphin Michel, daughter of Field Marshal Sir John Michel.

He was commissioned a second lieutenant in the Lincolnshire Regiment on 14 September 1887, and transferred to the 21st Lancers as he was promoted to lieutenant on 6 November 1889.

== Details of Victoria Cross ==
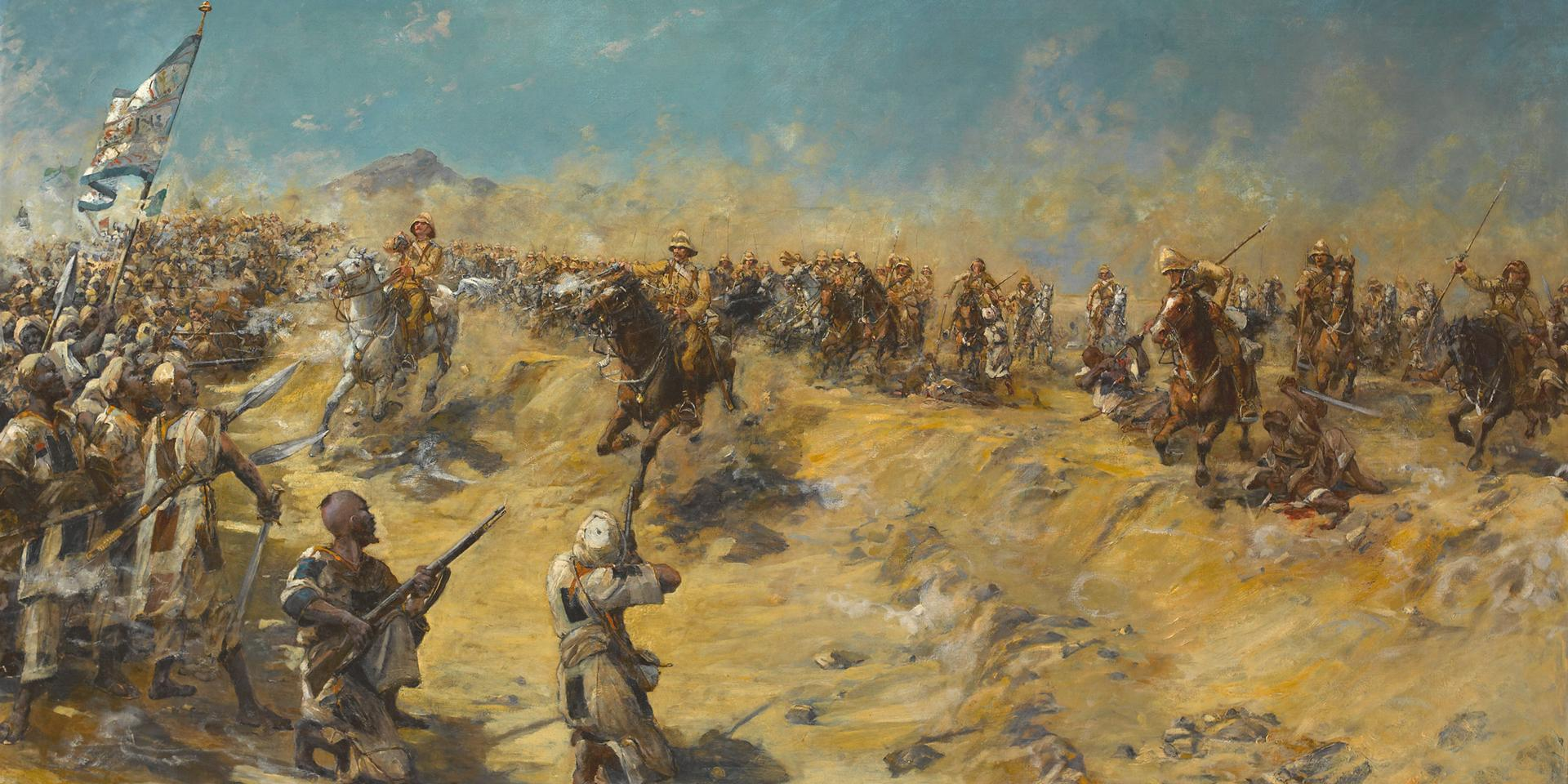
The Charge of the 21st Lancers at Omdurman by Edward Matthew Hale, 1899

De Montmorency was 31 years old, and a lieutenant in the 21st Lancers (Empress of India's), British Army during the Sudan Campaign when the following deed took place for which he was awarded the VC:

On 2 September 1898 at the Battle of Omdurman, Sudan, after the charge, Lieutenant de Montmorency returned to help an officer who was lying surrounded by a great many Dervishes. He drove the Dervishes off and finding that the officer was dead, put the body on his horse which then broke away. Captain Paul Aloysius Kenna and a corporal then came to his assistance and he was able to rejoin his regiment. His citation read:

'At the Battle of Khartum on the 2nd September 1898, Lieutenant de Montmorency, after the charge of the 21st Lancers, returned to assist Second Lieutenant R. G. Grenfell, who was lying surrounded by a large body of Dervishes. Lieutenant de Montmorency drove the Dervishes off, and, finding Lieutenant Grenfell dead, put the body on his horse which then broke away. Captain Kenna and Corporal Swarbrick then came to his assistance, and enabled him to re join, the Regiment, which had begun to open a heavy fire on the enemy.'

== Later military career ==
De Montmorency was promoted to the rank of captain on 2 August 1899, having in the previous October been despatched on special service to South Africa, where he raised and commanded a special body of scouts, Montmorency's Scouts. Following the outbreak of the Second Boer War in October 1899, the Scouts were involved in fighting in Cape Colony. He was killed in action at the Battle of Stormberg, Dordrecht, Cape Colony, on 23 February 1900.
