= Sparky's Magic Piano =

Audio drama

Sparky's Magic Piano is the second in a series of children’s audio stories featuring Sparky, an original character created for Capitol Records in 1947. (Sparky also appeared in comic books as a sidekick to Capitol’s other famous creation, Bozo the Clown.) Sparky is a boy with an overactive imagination. His adventures involve inanimate objects which magically come to life and talk to him.

== List of recordings featuring Sparky ==
- Sparky And The Talking Train (1947) was Sparky's first adventure on Capitol Records. It was a fantasy story, without the musical or educational element which marked three of the following stories.
- Sparky's Magic Piano (recorded in Hollywood, October 1947; released 1948) became the best-known of all the Sparky stories. It was voiced by Henry Blair, and featured musical accompaniment by noted Hollywood studio and session pianist Ray Turner.
- Sparky's Music Mix-up (1949) was the last Sparky record to be voiced by Henry Blair, and featured Stan Kenton and his orchestra.
- "Do you believe in Santa Claus?" / "I don't want a lot for Christmas" (1950) (Christmas single with Billy May)
- Sparky's Magic Echo (1952) featured a new voice for Sparky (Lee LeDoux), and tells how Sparky lost his echo in mountains, and goes in search of it.
- Sparky's Magic Baton (1954) returns to the musical vein, and tells how Sparky finds a conductor's baton in the street, and meets all the instruments of the orchestra. Sparky was voiced here by June Foray (although Lee LeDoux's name incorrectly appears on the label).

== General information ==
Sparky was portrayed in the first three episodes in the series by Henry Blair, but was later voiced by Lee LeDoux and June Foray. The series was produced by Alan Livingston with orchestration by Billy May. The piano pieces on Sparky's Magic Piano were performed by Ray Turner. The voice of the piano was generated by Sonovox, an early version of the talk box. The series also featured many voices familiar to fans of Disney and Warner Bros. cartoons, as well as notable Capitol music artists, such as Stan Kenton.

Sparky albums were originally released on standard shellac 10-inch 78 RPM records, usually with three discs in each album and sold in the book-like covers, whence the term “album” originates. These six-sided record albums had a total playing time of about 20 minutes. In later years, the series was reissued on vinyl 78, 45, LP, and CD.

Sparky’s Magic Piano was the most popular album in the series. It is one of the few children’s albums of the period to remain available, with Capitol reissuing it on audio cassette in the 1980s and EMI under its EMI Gold brand releasing a CD in 1997 that compiled it with the other Sparky audio dramas. Therefore, the original 78s have a relatively low collectors' value. However it is not easy to acquire a complete set of the original shellac records. The shellac records are distinguishable by their black Capitol labels. Vinyl 78 versions are more common, with purple Capitol labels and sometimes a “Bozo Approved” logo in the corner of the album cover.

The unusual popularity of Sparky’s Magic Piano can be attributed to the fact that the album is not only an excellent work of children’s fantasy; it also has a useful moral that was inspirational to any child practising a musical instrument or studying classical music. Thus the album is a practical teaching tool as well as entertainment.

Because of the success of Sparky’s Magic Piano, two of the subsequent Sparky albums (Sparky's Music Mix-up and Sparky's Magic Baton) also involved talking musical instruments giving lessons for music students. Therefore, the series seems to have taken a different direction to that which may have been originally intended. (The first album about talking trains was not musical, and was more dramatic than educational.)

== Sparky's Magic Piano plot summary ==
Sparky is a young child who hates practising the piano. One day, when he expresses his dislike for practising, the piano talks to him, and tells him that he will show him what it is like to play the piano well, and that all Sparky has to do is run his fingers over the keys, and the piano will play whatever Sparky chooses. Sparky then amazes his mother with his playing, and she calls his piano teacher. The two adults decide to book concerts across the country, with Sparky as a solo pianist. Sparky insists that he must take his own piano with him to all his concerts, and his mother agrees. However, the piano will only play for Sparky for a limited time, and during his biggest concert in New York, after he finishes his repertoire and the audience requests for an encore, time runs out. Sparky begs the piano to play, but it does not respond, and Sparky is reduced to banging helplessly on the keys. He hears his mother calling him, and he awakens and finds himself at home. It then becomes apparent to the listener, and to Sparky, that the entire experience was a dream. But it has given Sparky a new appreciation of the piano, and he vows to keep practising until he can play as well as he did in his dream.

== List of music in Sparky's Magic Piano ==
The following are the piano works which appear in Sparky's Magic Piano in the order in which they appear in the story.

- Léonard Gautier - The Secret
- Chopin - Waltz in E minor, Opus posth.
- Chopin - Etude in C minor ("Revolutionary"), Opus 10 number 12
- Rimsky-Korsakov (adapted from the arrangement by J. Strimer) - The Flight of the Bumblebee (electronically played at double speed)
- Chopin - Etude in C sharp minor, Opus 10 number 4
- Liszt - Hungarian Rhapsody no. 2, in C sharp minor (excerpt from the end of the piece, arranged for piano and orchestra)
- Beethoven - Piano Sonata number 14 ("Moonlight") in C sharp minor, Opus 27 number 2 (excerpt from the 1st mvt, arranged for piano and orchestra)
- Chopin - Waltz in C sharp minor, Opus 64 number 2 (excerpt)
- Rachmaninov - Prelude in C Sharp Minor (truncated, and arranged for piano and orchestra)
- Mendelssohn - "The Spinning Song" (from Song Without Words), Opus 67 number 4 (announced by Sparky, but the piano refuses to play it, so the music is not heard)

== Sparky's Magic Piano animated version ==
In 1987, “Sparky’s Magic Piano” was animated for television, and was later released on video, but is now out of print. The animated version was directed by Lee Mishkin, produced and co-written by Alan Livingston (who also voices the piano), and features an expanded story running 48 minutes. The pace of the story is greatly slowed: Sparky is portrayed with less innocence and he developed an ego from his success, which is why the piano refuses to continue playing for him here; he has acquired a dog named Beans; his father is given a much bigger role, being opposed to Sparky's music tour and fame due to his correct fears that Sparky would develop a selfish persona at such a young age from the experience; and a bumbling music critic has been added to the cast who is out to prove Sparky is a fraud. The voice cast includes Vincent Price, Coral Browne, Tony Curtis, Cloris Leachman, Josh Rodine, Mel Blanc, and William Schallert, with orchestration by Lalo Schifrin and piano music by Leonard Pennario. At the end of this version, it also appears all to have been a dream, with the final voice over claiming "it wasn't a magic piano after all.." (after which the piano shows a face and winks to the audience) "or was it?"...

Animation was done by Pacific Rim Productions, a company set up by Livingston in 1987, in order for him to have complete control over his project. It also participated on, among others, Hanna-Barbera and DiC Entertainment series, and did ink-and-paint work for The Little Mermaid. According to writer Michael Mallory, it "pushed the envelope in terms of Sino-American production set-ups".

== List of music in the story ==
- Léonard Gautier - The Secret
- Frédéric Chopin - Étude Op. 10, No. 12 (Chopin)
- Frédéric Chopin - Impromptu N°4 in C sharp minor, Op. 66 Fantaisie-Impromptu
- Wolfgang Amadeus Mozart - Piano Sonata No. 10 (Mozart) in C Major, K 330
- Frédéric Chopin - Waltz in C-sharp minor, Op. 64, No. 2 (Chopin)
- Ludwig van Beethoven - Piano Sonata No. 8 (Beethoven)
- Johannes Brahms - Sixteen Waltzes, Op. 39 (Brahms)
- Wolfgang Amadeus Mozart - Eine kleine Nachtmusik, K. 525: III. Menuetto Allegretto
- Edvard Grieg - Piano Concerto (Grieg) in A minor, Op. 16
- Franz Liszt - Hungarian Rhapsody No. 2, in C sharp minor
- Ludwig van Beethoven - Piano Sonata No. 14 (Beethoven)
- Robert Schumann - Fantasiestücke, Op. 12, Aufschwung
- Louis Moreau Gottschalk - The Banjo (Gottschalk)
- Frédéric Chopin - Minute Waltz
- Sergei Rachmaninoff - Rhapsody on a Theme of Paganini
- Felix Mendelssohn - "The Spinning Song" (from Songs Without Words) (announced by Sparky, but the piano refuses to play it, so the music is not heard)

== References in popular culture ==
In 1978, Mancunian folk poet Les Barker released a comic parody entitled 'Sparky's Magic Contraceptive' on his live album, 'Mrs. Ackroyd: Superstar!'.

On the sleeve notes of All Over The World: The Very Best of Electric Light Orchestra, Jeff Lynne writes that he sometimes heard Sparky's Magic Piano on the radio when he was young. When he was creating "Mr. Blue Sky" in the studio in Stuttgart he came across a vocoder, the machine that made the piano talk, and included it on the backing track.

The teacher's line "I'll set the metronome" is sampled at the beginning of the Barenaked Ladies' song "Maybe Katie" from their 2003 album Everything to Everyone.

Sparky exclaiming "Now my singing voice is gone" is sampled at the end of the Avey Tare and Panda Bear song "Alvin Row", from their 2000 album Spirit They're Gone, Spirit They've Vanished.
