= Radically Invasive Projectile =

Modern expanding bullet

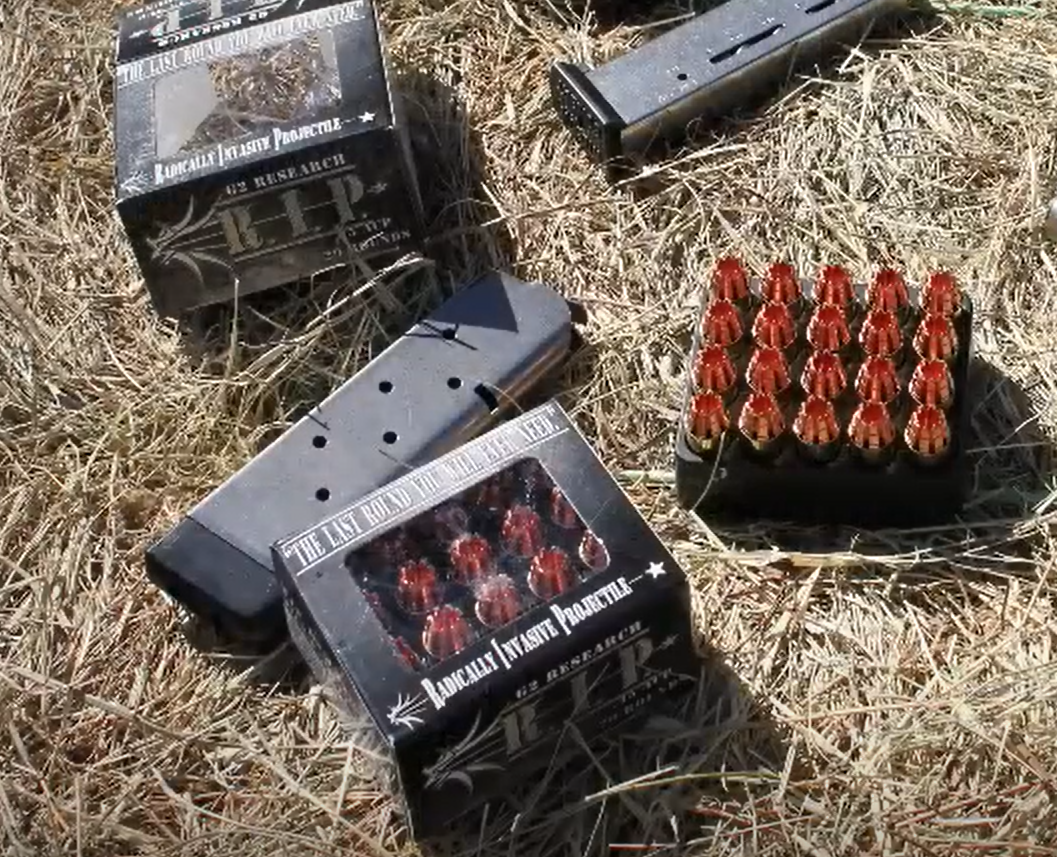
An assortment of R.I.P rounds

The Radically Invasive Projectile (R.I.P) is a type of expanding projectile created by the G2 Research company in 2014. It is meant to possess higher penetration capability and velocity than other expanding rounds. Currently, it is available for common handgun calibers from .380 ACP to .45 ACP. For rifles, it is only usable with subsonic centerfire cartridges from .223 Remington to .308 Winchester. For shotguns, only a 12-gauge slug is offered.
