= Dum Dum Arsenal =

Former British military facility in West Bengal, India

Coordinates: 22.631973°N 88.423888°E

- Industry: Munitions
- Headquarters: Dum Dum in modern West Bengal, India
- Key people: Captain Neville Bertie-Clay

The Dum Dum Arsenal was a British military facility located near the town of Dum Dum in modern West Bengal, India.

The arsenal was at the centre of the Indian Rebellion of 1857, caused in part by rumours that the paper cartridges for their muzzle-loading rifles, which they were expected to bite open, were greased with pig lard (a problem for Muslims) or cow fat (a problem for Hindus).

It was at this arsenal that Captain Neville Bertie-Clay developed the .303-inch Mark II Special cartridge, incorporating the original so-called "Dum-dum bullet", a soft-point bullet designed to mushroom on striking. This was the first in a series of expanding bullets developed by the British for military use. They were later banned in warfare by the Hague Convention as being "too inhumane."

On 7 December 1908, a serious, accidental explosion occurred at the Dum Dum arsenal, resulting in the death or serious injury to about 50 workers.

== History ==
The Dum Dum Ordnance Factory was founded on land adjacent to the Bengal artillery cantonment during 1846. It was established after First Anglo-Afghan War, where British East India Company sought a local source of small-arms ammunition. It is a production house for paper cartridges, bullets, and shell components for the Company’s armies in India. The facility worked in tandem with the larger Gun & Shell Factory at Cossipore, forming the nucleus of Bengal’s ordnance manufacturing network.

In late 1856–early 1857, rumours spread among Indian sepoys that the paper cartridges issued at Dum Dum were greased with lard or cow tallow, substances offensive to Muslim and Hindu soldiers respectively. According to contemporary accounts, a low‑caste factory worker taunted a Brahmin soldier about forced contact with these fats, prompting the sepoy to raise the alarm over sacrilege. This controversy over biting cartridges is widely regarded as one of the immediate triggers of the 1857 revolt in Bengal and beyond.

At Dum Dum, Captain Neville Bertie-Clay (1872–1916) led experiments on soft‑point bullets for the .303 British rifle. By 1890 he had produced the Mark II Special cartridge, later known as the "Dum‑dum bullet", with a hollowed lead tip designed to expand on impact and cause larger wounds. This innovation was first used on the North‑West Frontier and in colonial policing actions, drawing moral condemnation for its brutality. Expanding bullets of this type were subsequently prohibited in international warfare by the 1899 Hague Convention due to their "inhumane" effects.

On 7 December 1908, a devastating accidental explosion rocked the Dum Dum Arsenal. Reports indicate that several tonnes of powder detonated in the main cartridge‑loading hall, killing or injuring approximately fifty Indian workers and causing extensive damage to the factory buildings. The calamity prompted changes to safety protocols in colonial arsenals across India.
