= Stanley Berkeley =

English painter (1855–1909)

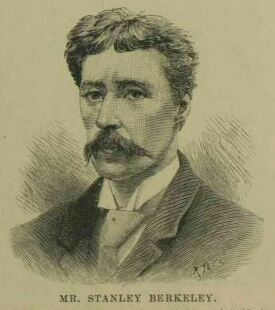
Stanley Berkeley ca. 1892, when he contributed to The Illustrated London News

Stanley Berkeley (1855–1909) was an English painter of animal, sporting and historical subjects, especially military scenes. Born in London, he exhibited regularly at the Royal Academy, the Grafton Galleries, the New Watercolour Society, and elsewhere from 1878 until 1902, and many of his pictures were retrospective military scenes of the English Civil War and the Battle of Waterloo, such as For God and King: An Incident in the Civil War, and Gordons and Greys to the front: An Incident at Waterloo.

Berkeley also depicted contemporary events and several were published as photogravures by Henry Graves including The Victory of Candahar, Charge of the Gordon Highlanders at Dargai, Atbara, and Omdurman. Some of his most popular pictures were representations of dramatic events in the Boer War.

He also provided illustrations for various books, magazines and newspapers, and produced many works in water-color and monochrome. In 1884, he was elected a member of the Royal Society of Painters and Etchers for his illustration work. Berkeley married the genre and landscape painter, Edith Berkeley and they lived at Surbiton Hill, in Surrey, where he died on 24 April 1909.

== Paintings ==
- Desperate Odds
- The Charge of Scarlett's Three Hundred or Heavy Brigade at Balaklava, October 25, 1854 (Scots Greys and Inniskillens)
- Cornered at Last
- Might is Right
- Completely Routed
- Shot (1883)
- Prince Rupert (The last charge at Edgehill) (1884)
- General Gordon and the Slave Dealers of Darfour (1885
- For God and King: an incident in the Civil War (1889)
- The sunken road of Ohain: an incident in the Battle of Waterloo (1894)
- The Last Stand at Abu Klea
- The Charge of the Gordon Highlanders at Dargai (1897)
- Gordons and Greys to the Front (1898 - Private Collection)
- Atbara: The Cameron Highlanders taking the Stockade (1898)
- Omdurman (Charge of the 21st Lancers) (1898)
- Gone away (1900)
- General Gordon quelling a riot at Darfur (1900)
- Saving the Guns at Colenso

== Gallery ==
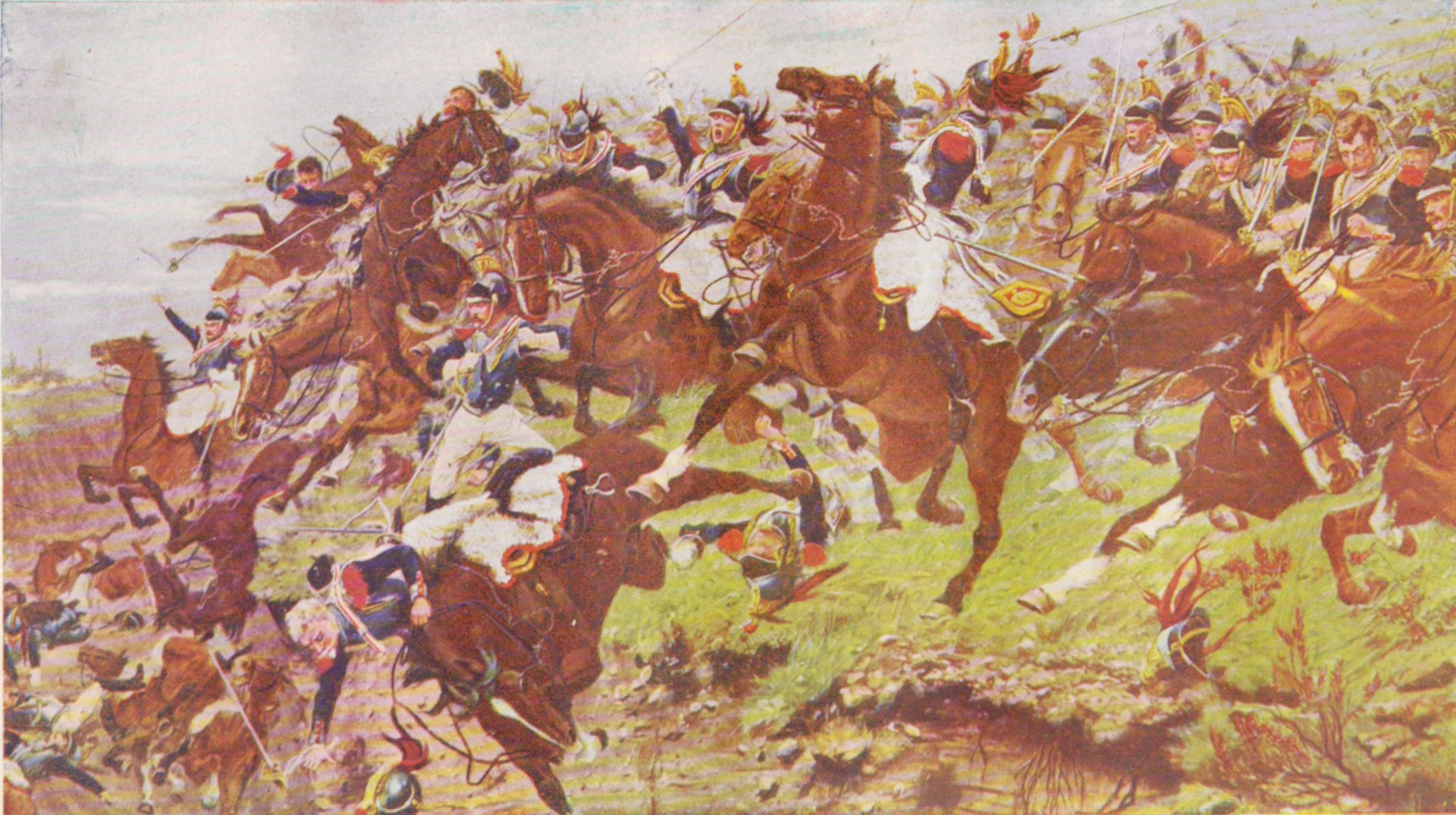
"The Sunken Road of Ohain: an incident in the battle of Waterloo"

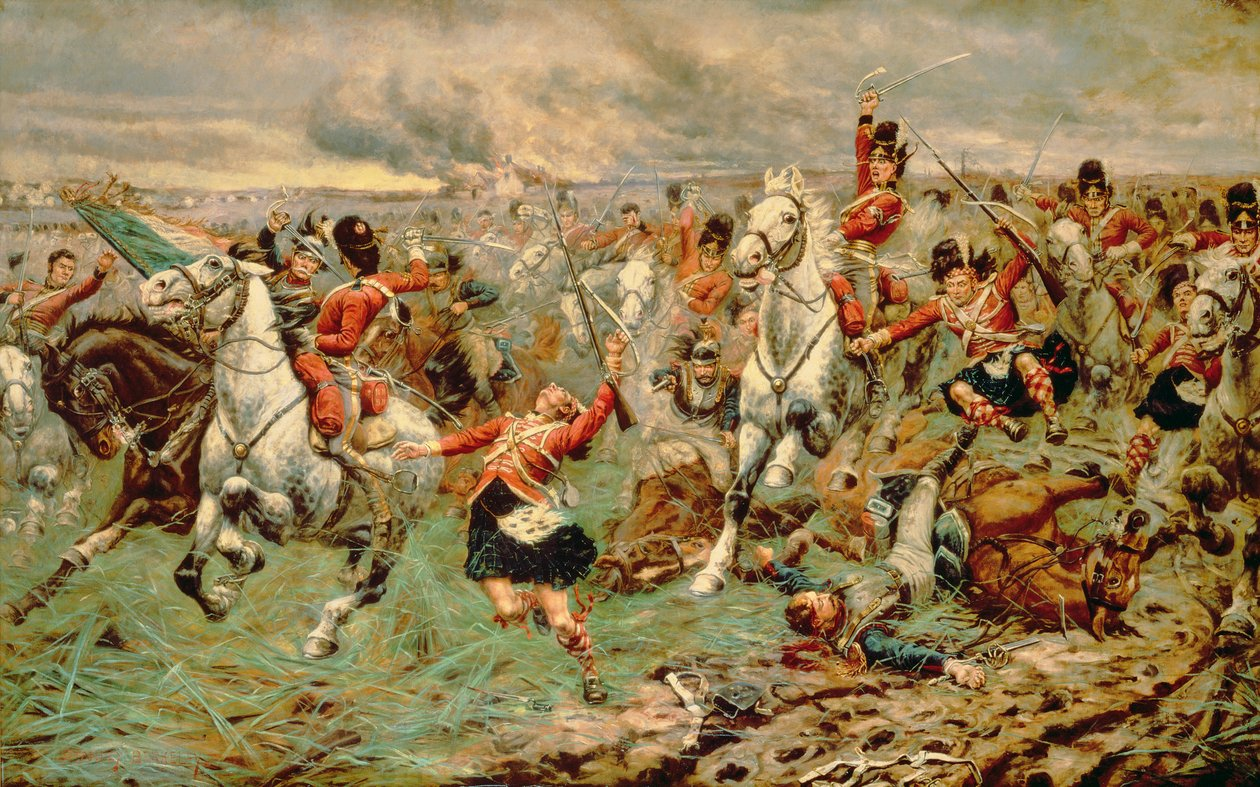
Gordons and Greys to the Front (1898)

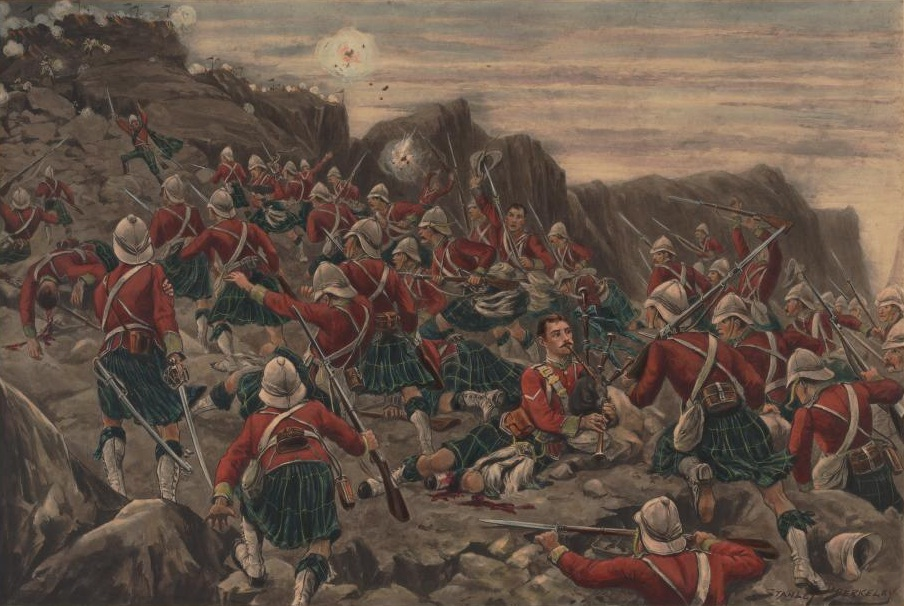
"Charge of the Gordon Highlanders at Dargai"

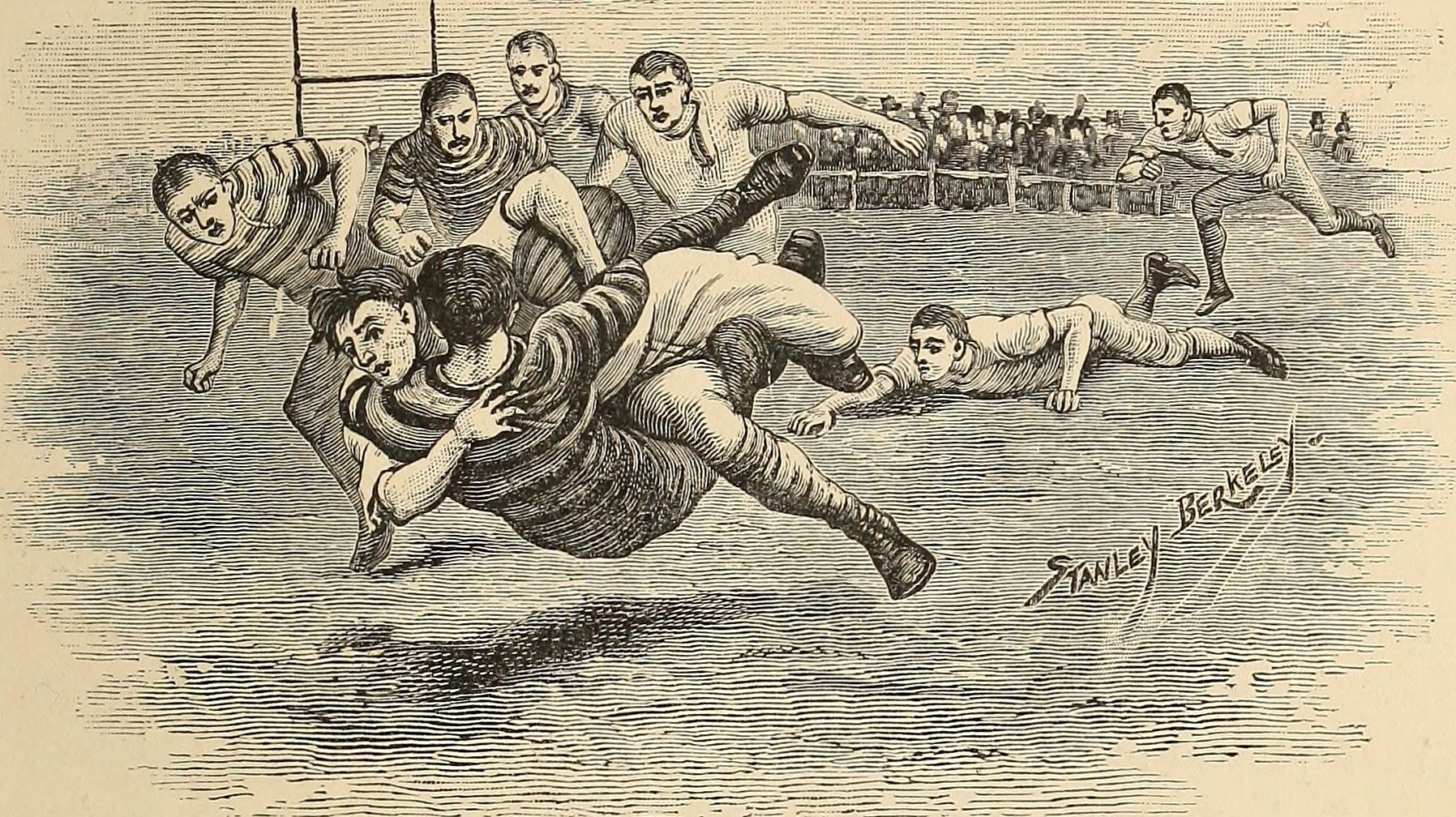
Rugby union match
