= Charles Hull (VC) =

English recipient of the Victoria Cross

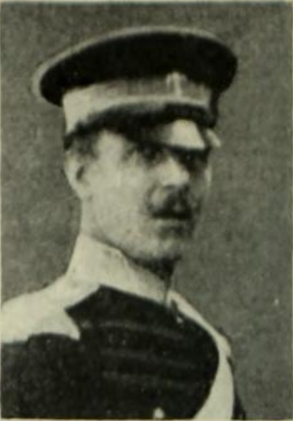
- Born: 24 July 1890; Harrogate, West Riding of Yorkshire, England
- Died: 13 February 1953 (aged 62); Leeds, West Yorkshire
- Burial place: Woodhouse Lane Cemetery, Leeds
- Military career
- Allegiance: United Kingdom
- Branch: British Army
- Service years: 1907 - 1919
- Rank: Corporal
- Units: 21st Lancers
- Conflicts: World War I
- Awards: Victoria Cross; Croix de Guerre
- Other work: Police officer

Charles Hull VC (24 July 1890 – 13 February 1953) was an English recipient of the Victoria Cross, the highest and most prestigious award for gallantry in the face of the enemy that can be awarded to British and Commonwealth forces during the First World War.

== Details ==
Hull worked as a postman in Harrogate before enlisting in the 21st Lancers (Empress of India's) in 1907, where he was a shoeing-smith making and fitting horseshoes.

On 5 September 1915 Hull was a 25-years-old private when he rescued an officer from certain death at the hands of tribesmen at Hafiz Kor on the North West Frontier of British India, an action for which he was awarded the VC. The citation was published in the London Gazette on 3 March 1916 and read:

"1053 Private (Shoeing-Smith) Charles Hull, 21st Lancers. For most conspicuous bravery. When under close fire of the enemy, who were within a few yards, he rescued Captain G. E. D. Learoyd, whose horse had been shot, by taking him up behind him and galloping into safety. Shoeing-Smith Hull acted entirely on his own initiative, and saved his officer's life at the imminent risk of his own."

He later achieved the rank of corporal. After the war he joined Leeds Constabulary and rose to the rank of sergeant. Hull is buried in Woodhouse Cemetery, Leeds.

== The Medal ==
His VC is on display in The Royal Lancers and Nottinghamshire Yeomanry Museum in Thoresby Hall, Nottinghamshire.

== Bibliography ==
- Gliddon, Gerald (2005). The Sideshows. VCs of the First World War. Gloucestershire, England: Sutton Publishing. ISBN 978-0-7509-2084-1.
