= The Charge of the 21st Lancers at Omdurman =

Painting by Edward Matthew Hale

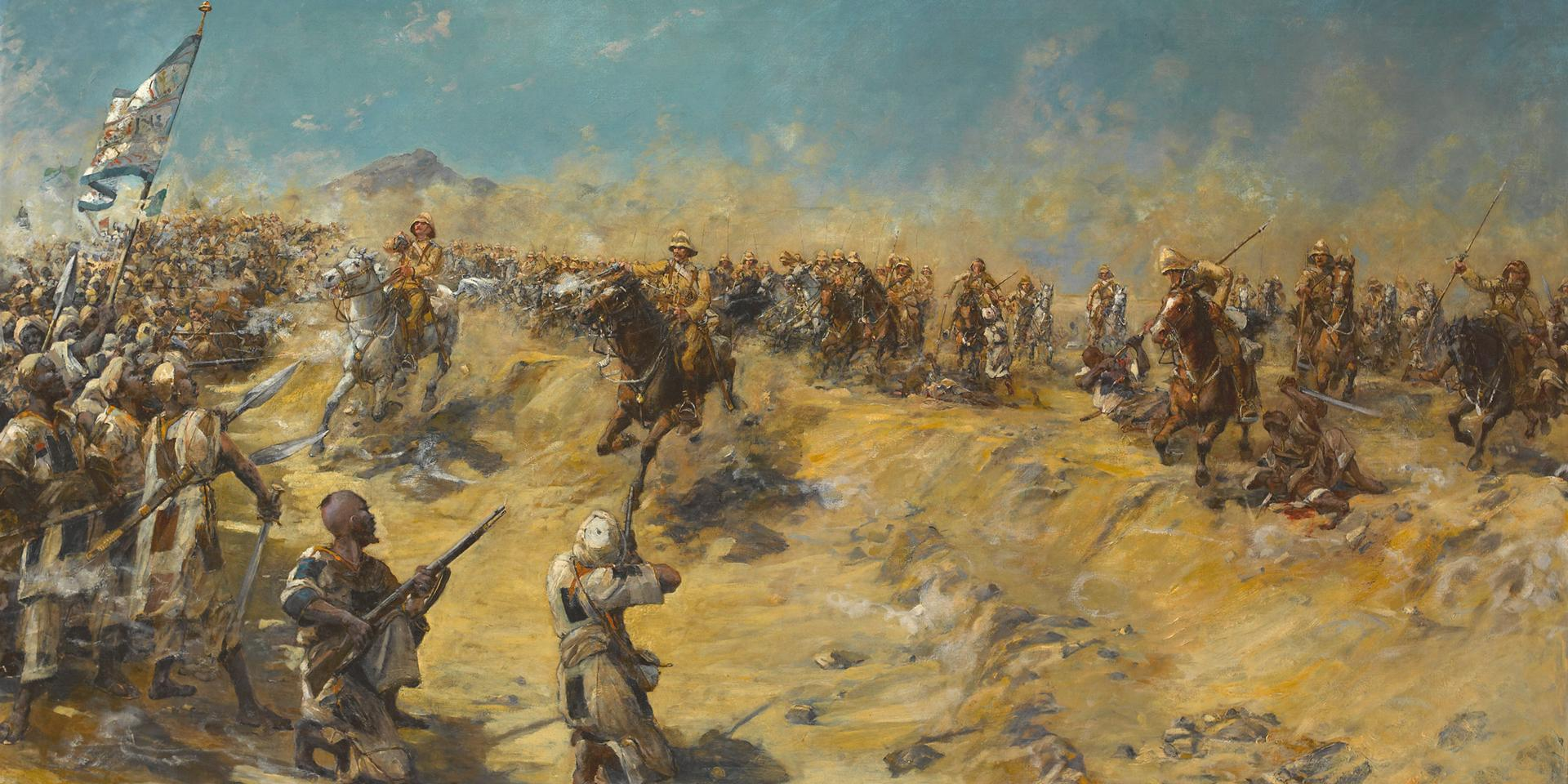
- Artist: Edward Matthew Hale
- Year: 1899
- Type: Oil on canvas, history painting
- Dimensions: 91.6 cm × 152.5 cm (36.1 in × 60.0 in)
- Location: National Army Museum, Chelsea

The Charge of the 21st Lancers at Omdurman is an 1899 oil painting by the British artist Edward Matthew Hale. It depicts one of the last full-scale cavalry charges made by the British Army at the Battle of Omdurman fought near Khartoum on 2 September 1898. It shows the 21st Lancers charging at the Mahdist forces, having massively underestimated the scale of the enemy troops. The hard-fought action ended in the award of three Victoria Crosses to members of the regiment. Winston Churchill was a notable participant in the charge who later wrote about it in his book The River War. The battle ended in a decisive victory for the Anglo-Egyptian forces under Herbert Kitchener.

The painting is part of the collection of the National Army Museum in London, which acquired it in 1957. Another notable depiction of the charge was produced thr same year by William Barnes Wollen who displayed it at the Royal Academy Exhibition of 1899.

== Bibliography ==
- Harrington, Peter. British Artists and War: The Face of Battle in Paintings and Prints, 1700-1914. Greenhill Books, 1993.
- Schwartzwald, Jack L. Europe on the Path to Self-Destruction: Nationalism and the Struggle for Hegemony, 1815-1945. McFarland, 2022.
- Tucker-Jones, Anthony. Churchill, Master and Commander: Winston Churchill at War 1895–1945. Bloomsbury, 2023.
