= Neville Bertie-Clay =

British Army officer

- Born: Neville Sneyd Clay; 22 July 1864; Chhindwara, British India
- Died: 17 October 1938 (aged 74); Tahiti, Society Islands
- Military career
- Allegiance: United Kingdom
- Branch: British Army
- Rank: Lieutenant-Colonel
- Unit: Royal Artillery
- Awards: French Croix de Guerre

Lt.-Col. Neville Sneyd Bertie-Clay (22 July 1864 – 17 October 1938) was a British army officer. He served in the Royal Artillery and in the Royal Garrison Artillery, but spent much of his career on secondment to the Indian Ordnance Department of the Indian Army. Bertie-Clay invented the dum dum soft-pointed bullet in 1896 as the Mark II Lee-Metford bullet then in use was perceived to leave a small wound with insufficient stopping power to halt a determined charge. The dum dum would later be outlawed for use in warfare by the Hague Convention of 1899 but remains in use for police firearms and hunting.

== Army career ==
Bertie-Clay was born in Chhindwara to Maj.-Gen. Edward Bertie Clay of the Bengal Staff Corps and Sarah Maria (née Attwood). His great-grandfather was Rear Admiral Edward Sneyd Clay (1768–1846). He served as an officer in the British Army from at least 6 June 1887 when, as a Lieutenant in the Royal Artillery, he was seconded to the Indian Ordnance Department of the Indian Army. He was promoted to the rank of Captain on 18 May 1892 whilst still on secondment, this promotion being later postponed to 25 May. Bertie-Clay received promotion to Major on 21 December 1901, remaining with the Indian Ordnance Department. By this point he had transferred to the Royal Garrison Artillery (RGA) which had been formed in 1899 as a sub-branch of the Royal Artillery to manage the heavy guns. Bertie-Clay was promoted to the rank of Lieutenant-Colonel on 18 May 1912, remaining with both the Ordnance Department and the RGA.

During the First World War, on 21 June 1917, Bertie-Clay was put on a "Special Appointment", receiving pay equivalent to a Staff Lieutenant (1st class) whilst doing so. His special appointment pay was upgraded to "Class GG" on 23 November 1918 and he relinquished both the appointment and pay on 24 July 1919. Bertie-Clay was awarded the French Croix de Guerre on 21 August 1919 at which point he had returned to the RGA and was once again seconded to the Indian Ordnance Department. Bertie-Clay died on 17 October 1938, having lived for some time at Villa La Pensée in Papara, Tahiti, Society Islands.

== Dum dum bullet ==
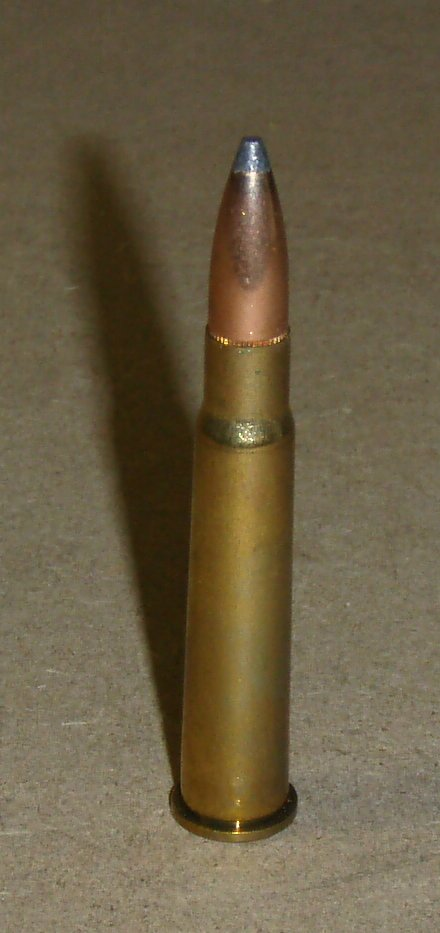
A .303 soft point bullet, similar to the original dum dums

Bertie-Clay is most famous for being the inventor of the dum dum, a soft-pointed bullet. At the time of their invention in 1896 Bertie-Clay was the Superintendent of the British arsenal at Dum Dum in Bengal. The Mark II Lee-Metford bullet then in use with the British Army was shown, during the Chitral Expedition of 1895, to leave a small wound with insufficient stopping power to halt a determined charge, particularly when fired at close range. The Mark II bullet had a full metal jacket and did not deform upon hitting a person, allowing it to travel straight through tissue and bone without smashing it. The British Medical Journal published a report on one tribesman who had been hit by six such bullets but recovered in hospital.

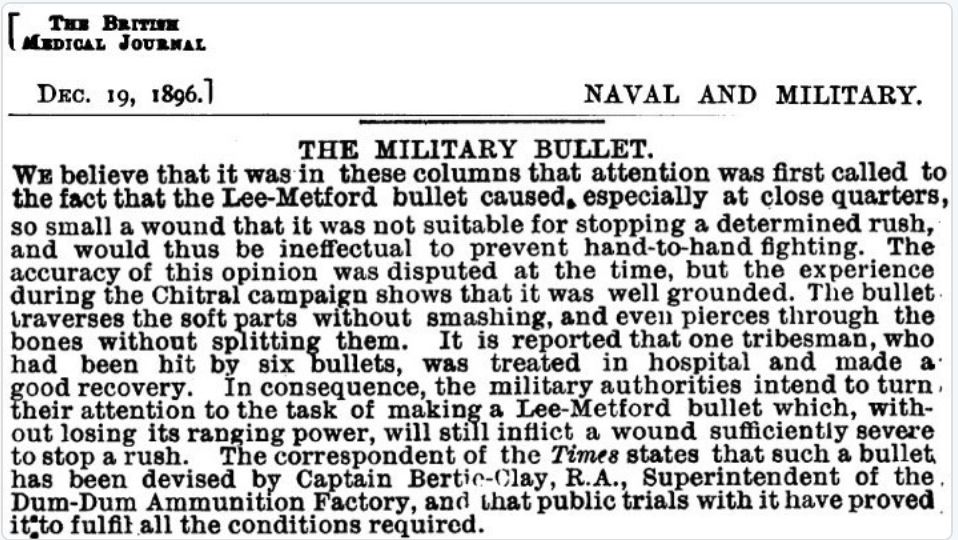
Composite image of the British Medical Journal article describing Capt Bertie-Clay's new type of bullet (Br Med J 1896;2:1810)

The military authorities decided that the bullet should be altered to increase its stopping power without affecting its range. Bertie-Clay developed a bullet at Dum Dum with a metal jacket that did not run the whole length of the bullet and so exposed the softer lead tip. When this bullet hit a target the lead head would deform (or "mushroom"), spreading the force of the bullet out and causing larger wounds. In public trials held in 1896 the bullet was proved to have a greater stopping power than the Mark II. This was not the first expanding bullet, hollow-point bullets had been developed earlier particularly for use in hunting.

The British Army adopted the bullet and used it against Asian and African opponents, but it was thought "too cruel" for use against Europeans. The dum dum bullet was banned by the Hague Convention of 1899 under rules that prohibited explosive bullets that had been taken over from the St. Petersburg Declaration of 1868. The delegates at the convention decided that the use of dum dum bullets in warfare was "contrary to the humanitarian spirit", despite the British delegation's protests that it was needed for colonial wars. The dum dum bullet is still in use by police forces for handguns to maximise stopping power and minimise the risk of passing through a target and hitting a bystander and in some types of game hunting.

== Bibliography ==
- Coupland, Robin; Loye, Dominique (March 2003). "The 1899 Hague Declaration concerning Expanding Bullets: A treaty effective for more than 100 years faces complex contemporary issues" (PDF). Current Issues and Comments. International Committee of the Red Cross: 136–142.
- Headrick, Daniel R. (June 1979). "The Tools of Imperialism: Technology and the Expansion of European Colonial Empires in the Nineteenth Century" (PDF). The Journal of Modern History. 51 (2): 231–263. doi:10.1086/241899. S2CID 144141748. Archived from the original (PDF) on 9 January 2009.
