= Expanding bullet =

Bullets that expand on impact with a solid object

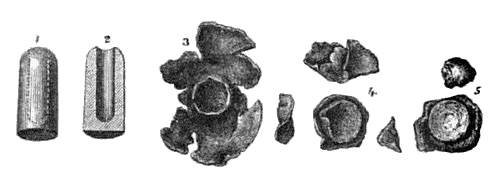
Drawings from 1870 of a hollow point express rifle bullet before firing (1, 2) and after recovery from the game animal (3, 4, 5), showing expansion and fragmentation

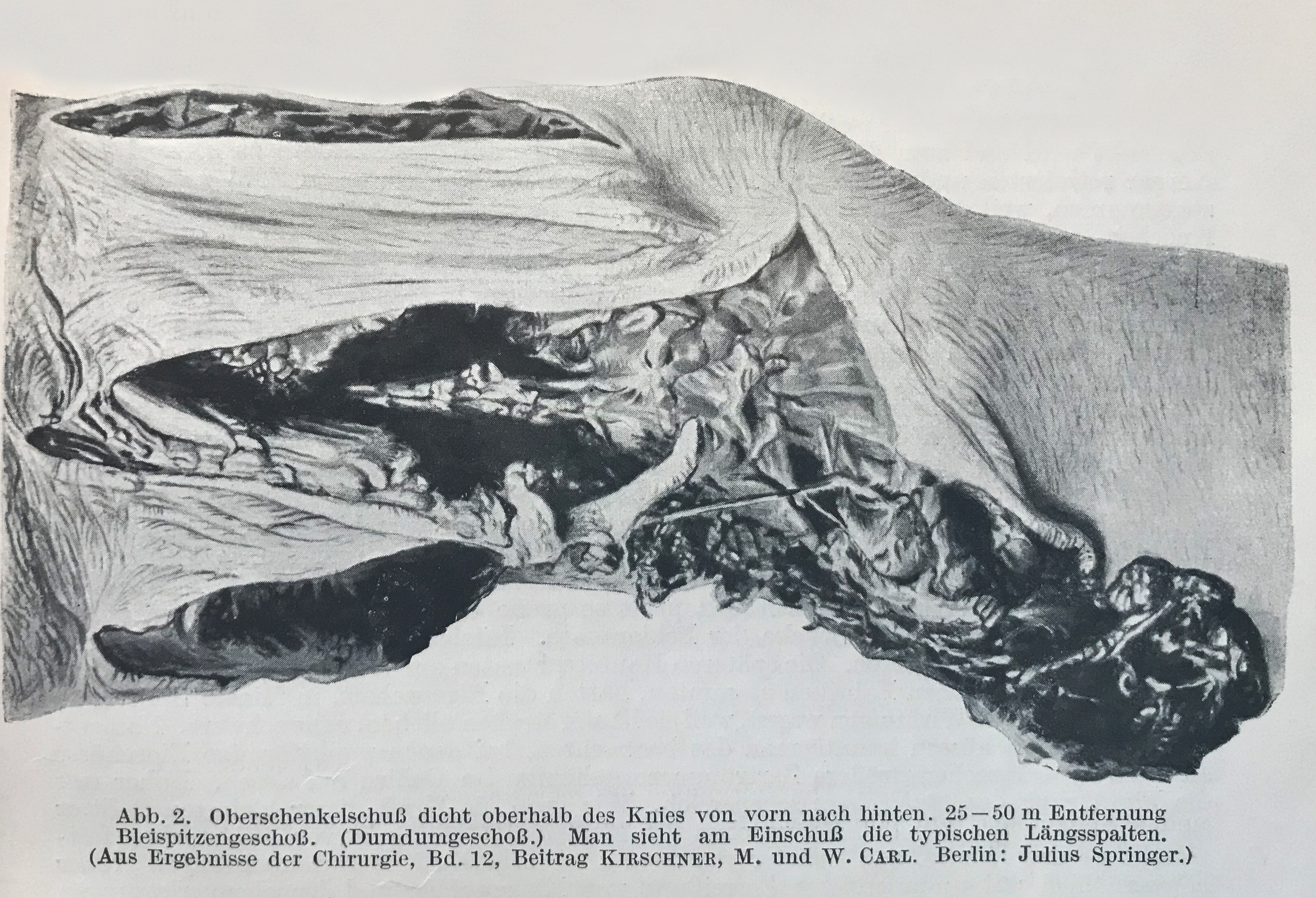
Leg wound by an expanding bullet

Expanding bullets, also known as dumdum bullets, are projectiles designed to expand on impact. This causes the bullet to increase in diameter, to combat over-penetration and produce a larger wound, thus causing more damage to a living target. For this reason, they are used for hunting and by police departments, but are generally prohibited for use in war under international humanitarian law. Two typical designs are the hollow-point bullet and the soft-point bullet.

== Function and use ==
Expanding bullets are designed to expand on impact, sometimes to as much as twice their original diameter. This slows the bullet down and allows more of its kinetic energy to be transferred to the target, creating a larger wound channel. For this reason, expanding bullets are often used in hunting because their stopping power increases the chance of a quick kill. There are a number of designs used for hunting different game and for use in weapons with different muzzle velocities. Bullets used for medium and large game need better penetration, which means they are designed to maintain their integrity and allow less expansion. The velocities at which the bullets hit affect their expansion and penetration.

Expanding bullets are less likely to pass through the target, and if they do, they will exit at a lower velocity. This reduces the risk of accidental injury to bystanders. For this reason, and to maximize the stopping effect, law enforcement organizations use expanding bullets. Even then, some penetration is needed, e.g., to penetrate a windshield or heavy clothing. Such a bullet would have less possibility of penetrating body armour or heavy equipment worn on the body.

== Names ==
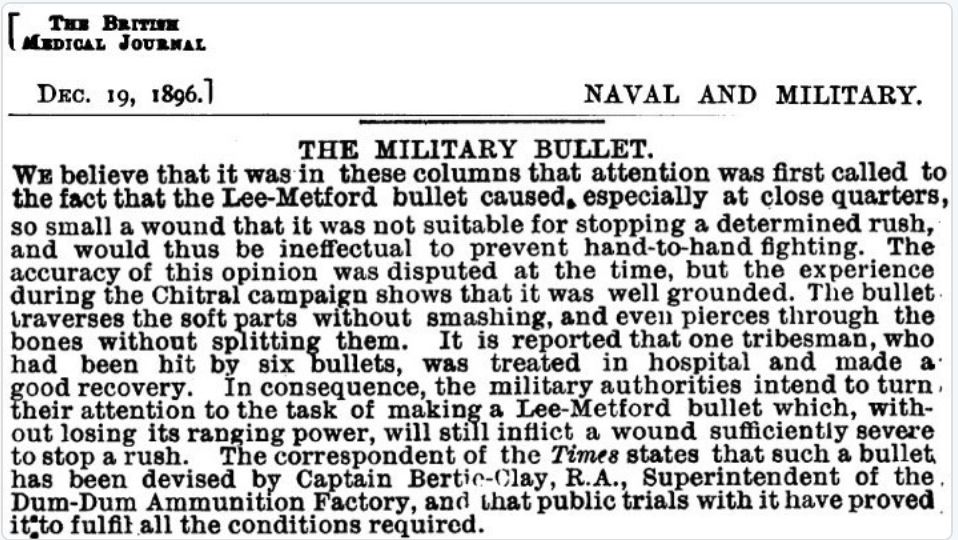
Composite image of the British Medical Journal article describing Capt Bertie-Clay's new type of bullet (British Medical Journal 1896;2:1810)

Expanding bullets were called Dum-Dum or dumdum after an early British example produced in 1896 in the Dum Dum Arsenal, near Calcutta, India, by Captain Neville Bertie-Clay. There were several expanding bullets produced by this arsenal for the .303 British cartridge, including soft-point and hollow-point designs. These were not the first expanding bullets, however; hollow-point expanding bullets were commonly used for hunting thin-skinned game in express rifles as early as the mid-1870s.

Also, the .303 was not the first military round with that trait since the old .577 Snider bullet had a hollow core, leaving wounds known for being particularly nasty. The use of the term dumdum for expanding bullets other than the early .303 designs is considered slang by most ammunition and ballistics sources. Manufacturers have many terms to describe the particular construction of the various types of expanding bullets, though most fall into the category of soft-point or hollow-point designs. The expansion itself is sometimes called mushrooming.

Another early name was General Tweedie's "mushroom bullet", cited in The New York Times in 1892.

== History ==
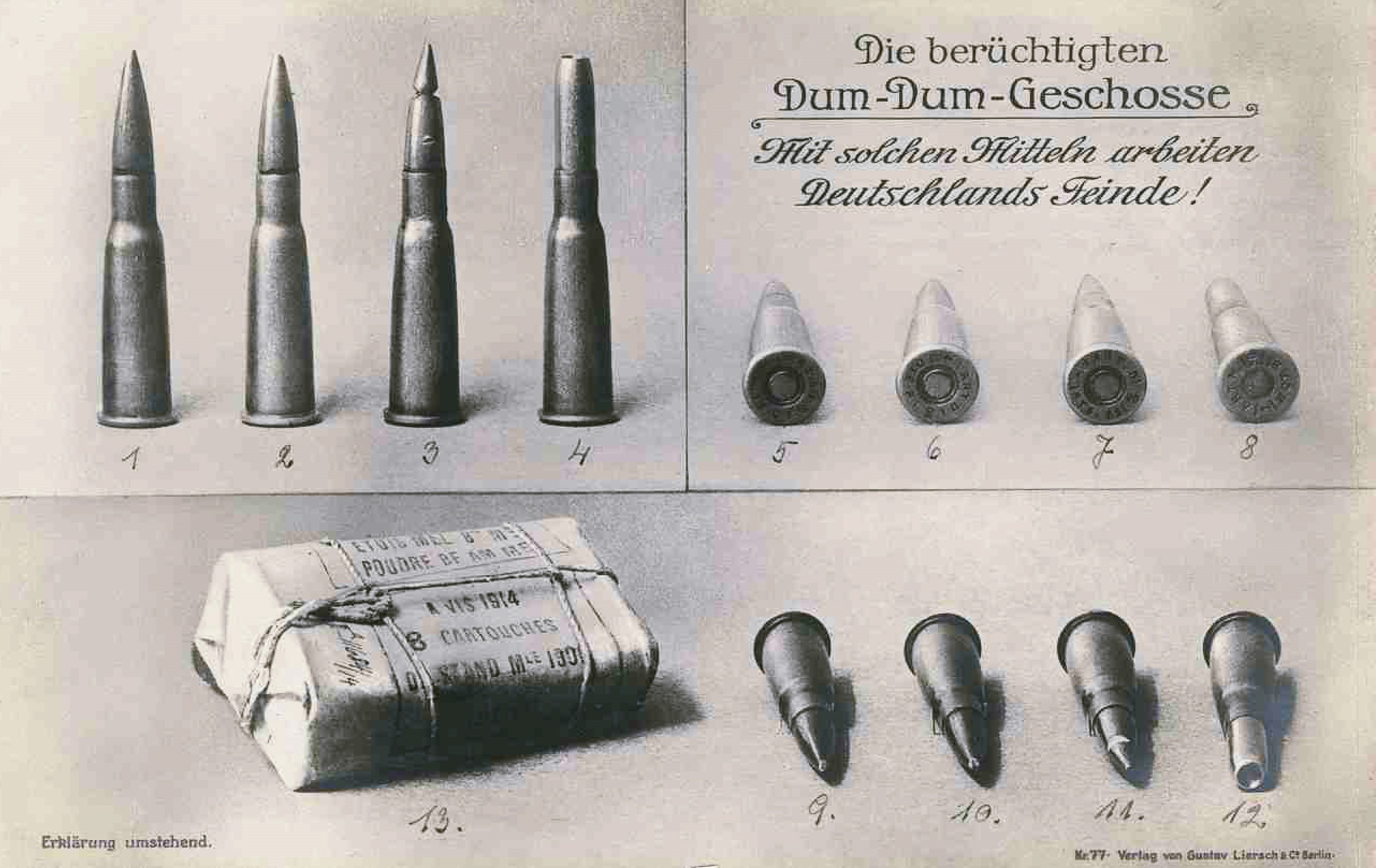
German WWI propaganda: French Dum-Dum bullets (c. 1916)

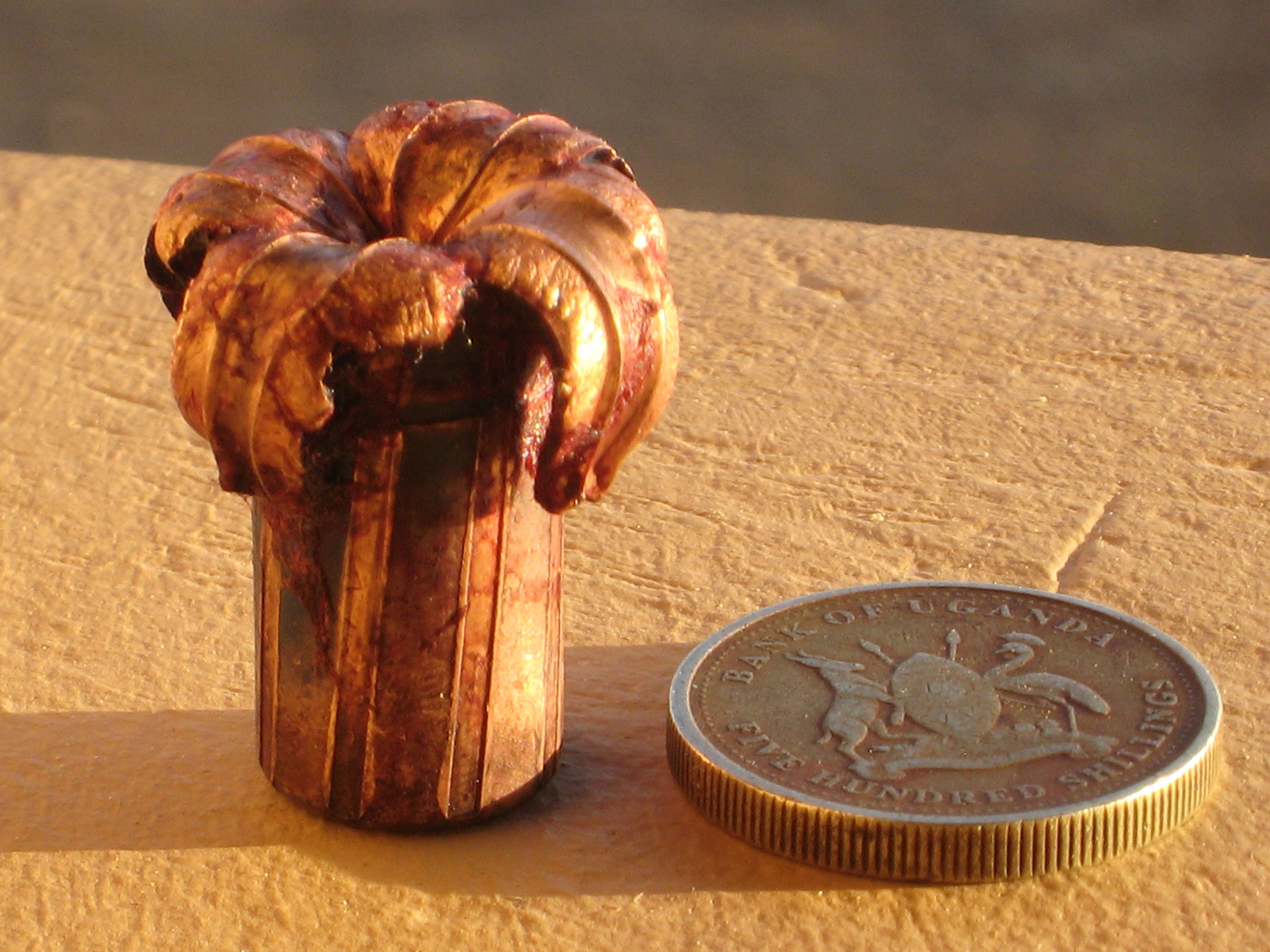
Expanded .458 hunting round (next to a Ugandan 500-shilling coin [23.5 mm diameter] for size reference), after killing an African buffalo

Early bullets were typically made in the form of spheres of nearly pure lead, which is a very soft metal. These would often flatten upon impact with the target, causing a wound larger than the original diameter of the ball. The adoption of rifling allowed the use of longer, heavier bullets, but these were still typically constructed of soft lead and would often double in diameter upon impact. In this case expansion was a side effect of materials, and there is no evidence that the bullets were designed to expand upon impact.

The earliest examples of bullets specifically designed to expand on impact were those fired by express rifles, which were developed in the mid-19th century. Express rifles used larger powder charges and lighter bullets than typical for the time to achieve very high velocities for black powder cartridges. One method of lightening the bullets used was to provide a deep cavity in the nose of the bullet. These were the first hollow-point bullets, and in addition to developing higher velocities, they also expanded significantly upon impact. These hollow-point bullets worked well on thin-skinned game, but tended to come apart on bigger game, resulting in insufficient penetration. One solution to this was the "cruciform expanding bullet", a solid bullet with a cross-shaped incision in the tip. This split section expanded only to the depth of the incision, making it an early form of controlled expansion bullet.

In the late 19th century, the invention of cordite and other nitrocellulose-based "smokeless" propellants permitted higher bullet-velocities than black powder, resulting in flatter trajectories and correspondingly higher hit probabilities. Attempts to limit recoil to an acceptable level led to higher-velocity rounds generally being smaller in diameter and lighter. To prevent lead fouling in the bore caused by the higher pressures and velocities, soft lead bullets were replaced by newly introduced full metal jacket bullets.

However, it soon became apparent that such hard, small-caliber rounds were less effective at wounding or killing an enemy than the older, large-caliber soft lead bullets. Within the British Indian Army, the Dum Dum Arsenal produced a solution: the jacketing was removed from the nose of the bullet, creating the first soft-point bullets. Since the Mark II jacket did not cover the base of the round, this could potentially lead to the jacketing being left in the barrel. This potential problem resulted in the rejection of the Dum Dum design and led to independent development of the Mark III, Mark IV (1897) and Mark V (1899) .303 British rounds, which were of the hollow-point design, with the jacket covering the base; while these were made in Britain, not at the Dum Dum Arsenal, the name "Dum-dum" had already become associated with expanding bullets, and continued to be used to refer to any expanding bullets. The expanding bullets expanded upon impact to a diameter significantly greater than the original .312 inch (7.92 mm) bullet diameter, producing larger diameter wounds than the full-metal-jacketed versions. The Mark IV was successful enough in its first use in the Battle of Omdurman that British soldiers issued with the standard Mark II bullets began to remove the top of the jacket, converting the Mark II bullets into improvised Dum-dum types.

In 1898, the German government lodged a protest against the use of the Mark IV bullet, claiming the wounds produced by the Mark IV were excessive and inhumane, thus violating the laws of war. The protest, however, was based on the comparison of the wounds produced by expanding and non-expanding bullets from high-velocity sporting rifles, rather than on comparison of the expanding .303 British bullets with the previous, large-bore service cartridge it replaced, the .577/450 Martini-Henry. With the energy on impact roughly the same, the wounds caused by the expanding bullet of the .303 were less severe than those caused by the larger-caliber, solid lead bullet used by the Martini-Henry.

The German protests were effective, however, resulting in the ban of the use of expanding bullets in warfare. The British replaced the hollow-point bullets with new full metal jacket bullets and used the remaining stocks of expanding bullets for practice.

During the Hague Convention of 1899, the majority of the delegates moved to prohibit future usage of expanding bullets, which was opposed by the American and British delegations. Historian Barbara Tuchman wrote that,

Developed by the British to stop the rush of fanatical tribesmen, the bullets were vigorously defended by Sir John Ardagh against the heated attack of all except the American military delegate, Captain Crozier, whose country was about to make use of them in the Philippines. In warfare against savages, Ardagh explained to an absorbed audience, "men penetrated through and through several times by our latest pattern of small calibre projectiles, which make small clean holes", were nevertheless able to rush on and come to close quarters. Some means had to be found to stop them. "The civilized soldier when shot recognizes that he is wounded and knows that the sooner he is attended to the sooner he will recover. He lies down on his stretcher and is taken off the field to his ambulance, where he is dressed or bandaged. Your fanatical barbarian, similarly wounded, continues to rush on, spear or sword in hand; and before you have the time to represent to him that his conduct is in flagrant violation of the understanding relative to the proper course for the wounded man to follow—he may have cut off your head."

However, the rest of the delegates at the 1899 Hague Convention were not persuaded by Ardagh's arguments and voted 22–2 to prohibit the future use of the dumdum bullet.

== International law ==
The Hague Convention of 1899, Declaration III, prohibits the use of expanding bullets in international warfare. This is often incorrectly believed to be prohibited by the Geneva Conventions, but it significantly predates those conventions, and is in fact a continuance of the Saint Petersburg Declaration of 1868, which had earlier banned exploding projectiles of less than 400 grams (14 ounces).

The text of the declaration states, "The present Declaration is only binding for the Contracting Powers in the case of a war between two or more of them". Until relatively recently, the prohibition on the use of expanding bullets was applicable only to international armed conflicts between the countries that have signed it. According to the International Committee of the Red Cross's customary international law study, customary international law now prohibits their use in any armed conflicts. This has been disputed by the United States, which maintains that the use of expanding bullets can be legal when there is a clear military necessity. The adoption of an amendment to Article 8 at the Review Conference of the Rome Statute in Kampala (2010) makes the use of expanding bullets in non-international armed conflict a war crime. One example of a war crime involving expanding ammunition is the August 1941 German killing of Soviet prisoners at Zhitomir, as a human experiment with captured Red Army materiel.

Because The Hague Convention applies only to the use of expanding bullets in war, the use of expanding rounds remains legal in other circumstances unless it is restricted or prohibited by local laws. Examples are use of expanding bullets in hunting in which it is desirable to stop the animal quickly, either to prevent loss of a game animal or to ensure a humane death of the animal, and in law enforcement or self-defence, if quickly neutralising an aggressor may be needed to prevent further loss of life or the bullet must remain inside the target to prevent collateral damage.

== See also ==
- Frangible bullet
- Glossary of firearms terminology
- Gold Dot
- Hydra-Shok
- Military necessity
