= 21st Lancers =

British Army cavalry regiment

21st Lancers (Empress of India's)
- Badge of the regiment
- Active: 1858–1921/1922
- Country: British India (1858–1862); United Kingdom (1862–1922)
- Type: Cavalry
- Colours: Dark blue uniform with French grey facings, white plume
- Engagements: Mahdist War; First World War; North-West Frontier

The 21st Lancers (Empress of India's) was a cavalry regiment of the British Army, raised in 1858 and combined with the 17th Lancers in 1922 to form the 17th/21st Lancers. Perhaps its most famous engagement was the Battle of Omdurman, where Winston Churchill (then an officer of the 4th Hussars), rode with the unit.

== History ==
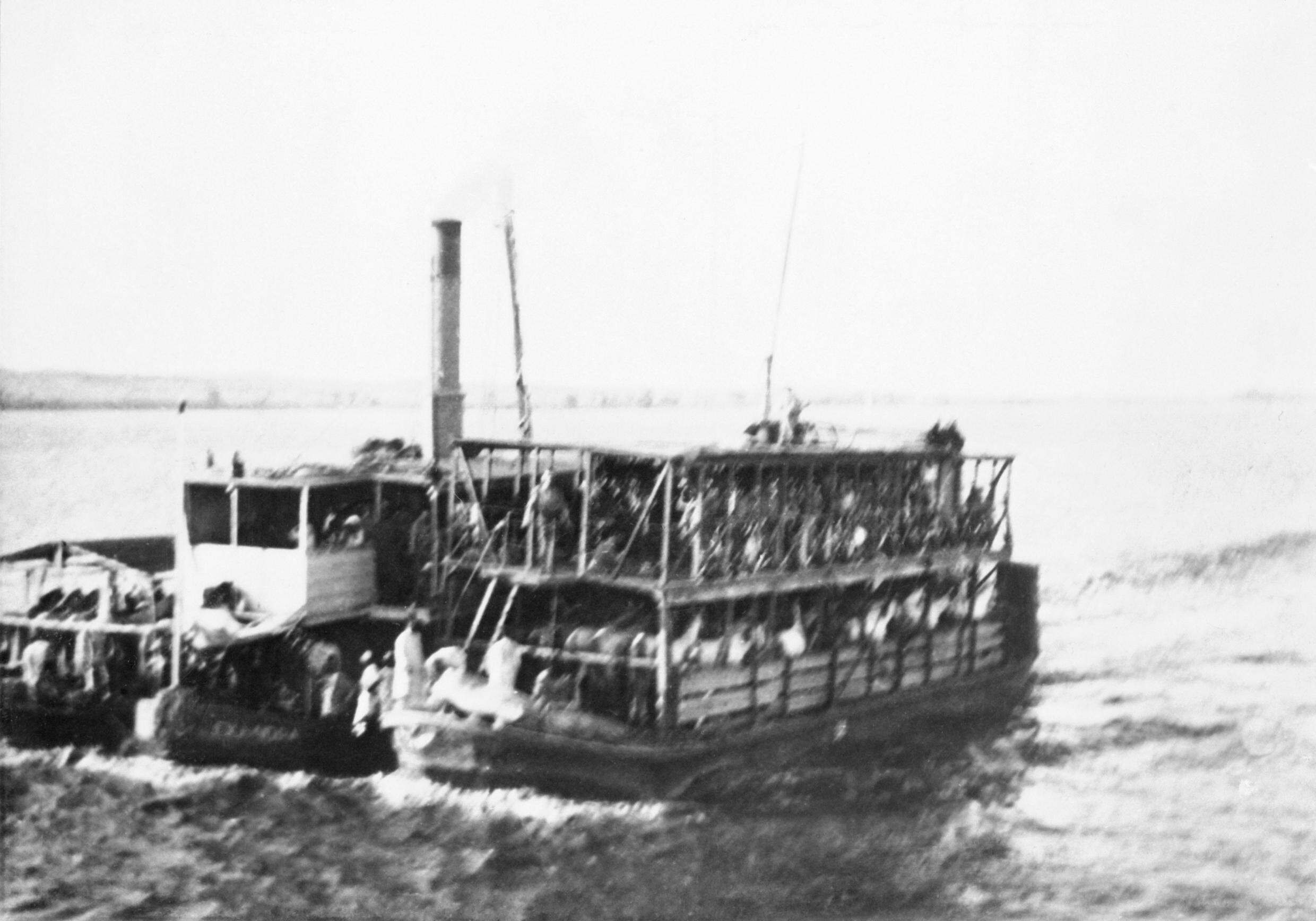
The 21st Lancers aboard a Nile steamer connecting the Egyptian railway at Asyut with the newly built Sudanese system during the 1898 campaign of the Mahdist War.

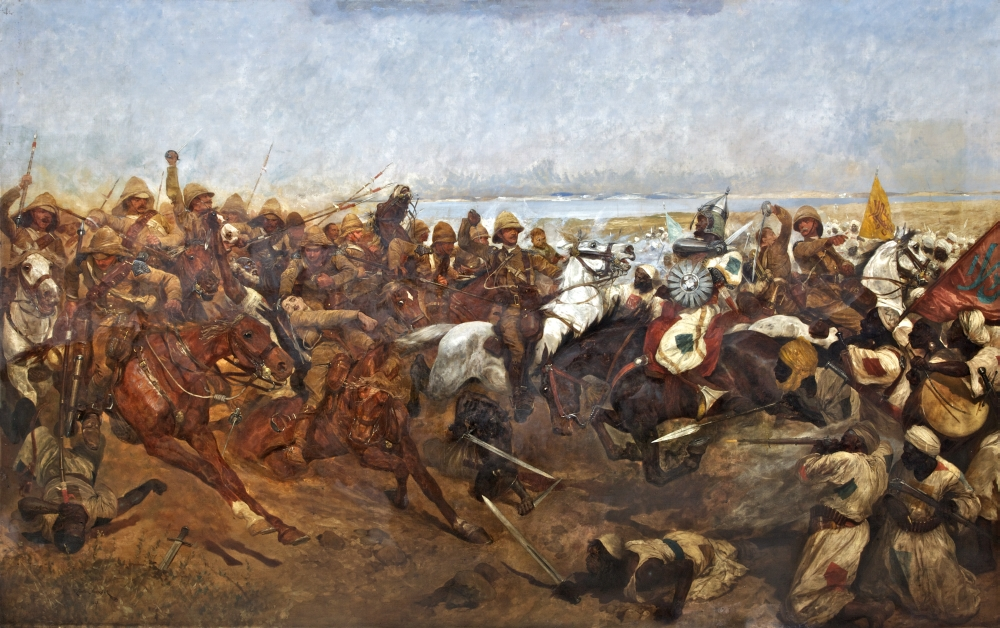
The charge of the 21st Lancers in the Battle of Omdurman, 2 September 1898

=== Formation ===
The regiment was originally raised in Bengal by the East India Company in 1858 as the 3rd Bengal European Light Cavalry, for service in the Indian Rebellion. As with all other "European" units of the Company, it was placed under the command of the British Crown in 1858, and formally moved into the British Army in 1862, when it was designated as a hussar regiment and titled the 21st Regiment of Hussars. A detachment saw service in the 1884–5 expedition to the Sudan, with the Light Camel Regiment. In 1897 it was re-designated as a lancer regiment, becoming the 21st Lancers. The Indian origin of the regiment was commemorated in its "French grey" facings - this distinctive light blue/grey shade having previously been the uniform colour of the East India Company's eight regiments of Bengal Native Cavalry.

=== Mahdist War ===
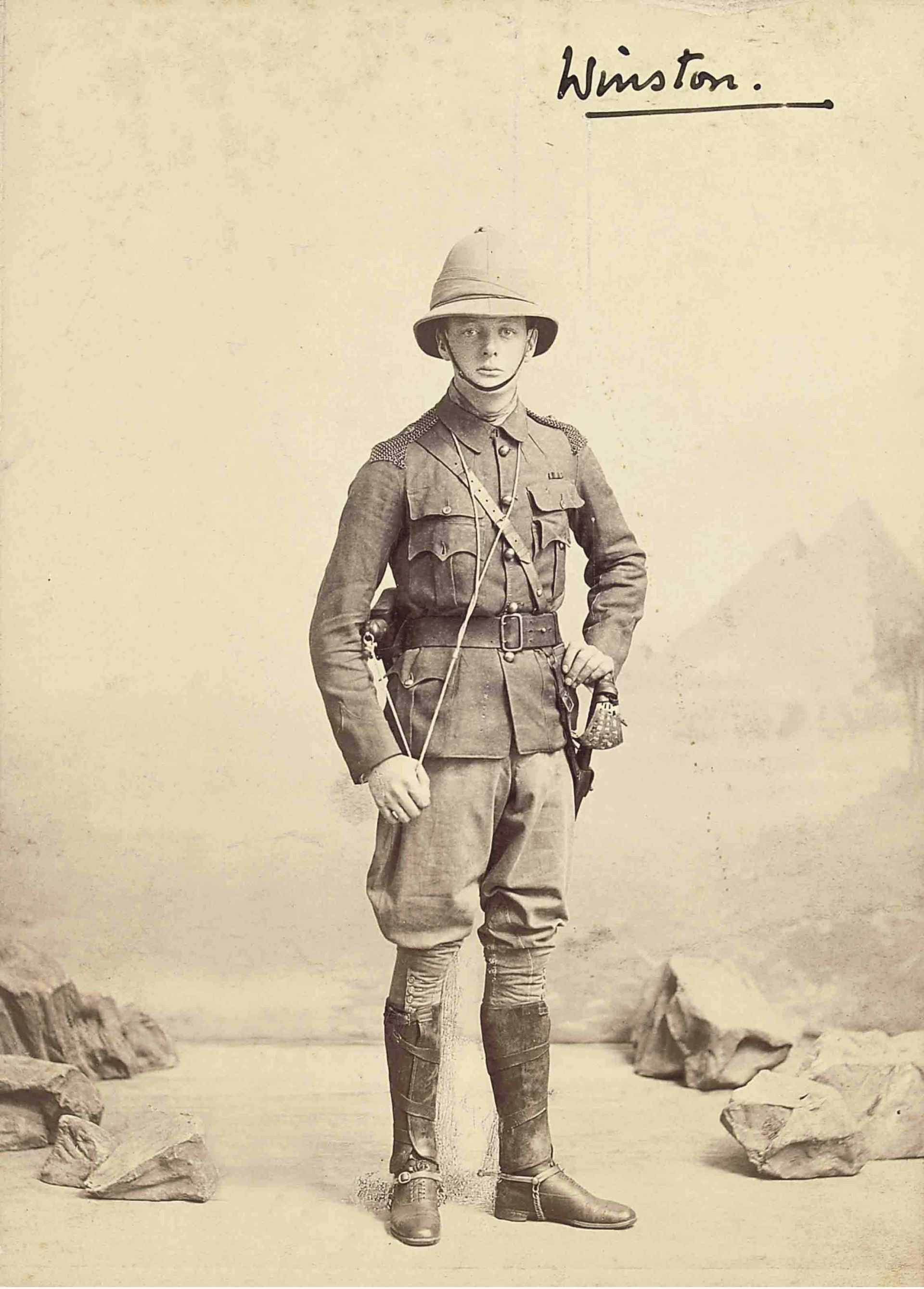
Lt Winston Churchill 1898

In 1898 the regiment served in Sudan during the Mahdist War, as the only British cavalry unit involved. It was there that the full regiment charged with lances in the classic cavalry style during the Battle of Omdurman in September 1898. Of less than 400 men involved in the charge 70 were killed and wounded and the regiment won three Victoria Crosses. These three were Private Thomas Byrne, Lieutenant Raymond de Montmorency and Captain Paul Kenna. This spectacular encounter earned considerable public attention and praise for the regiment, though it was also criticized as a costly and unnecessary anachronism - since the 2,000 Dervish spearmen dispersed by the 21st Lancers could have been destroyed by rifle fire with few if any British losses. Winston Churchill (then an officer of the 4th Hussars), rode with the unit.

"Khartoum" was the regiment's only battle honour, giving rise to the satirical regimental motto of "thou shalt not kill." That same year, the regiment was given the title 21st (Empress of India's) Lancers, taking the name from Queen Victoria who was the Empress of India.

=== Service in Ireland and India ===
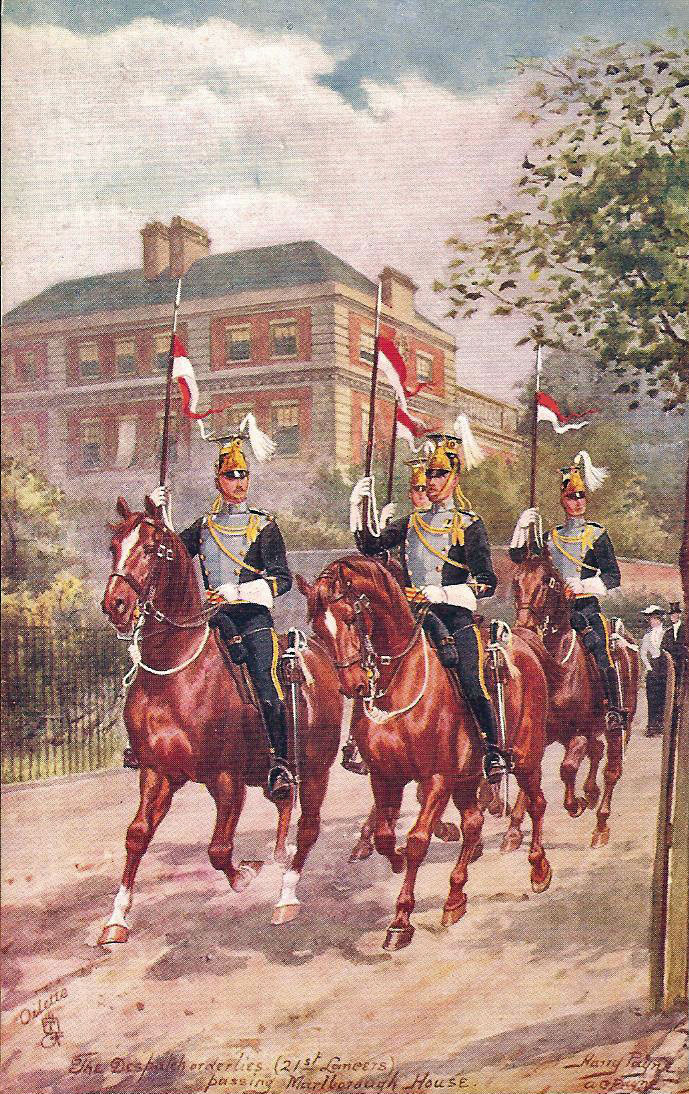
A troop from the 21st Lancers passing Marlborough House, circa 1911

The regiment was moved to Dublin in 1899, and served in Ireland for several years. In 1912 it was again posted to India. The 21st Lancers did not see service on the Western Front during the First World War, being the only regular cavalry regiment of the British Army to spend the duration of the war in India. The regiment did however see action on the North-West Frontier during 1915–16, with one trooper, Charles Hull, receiving the Victoria Cross. A single squadron made up of reservists served in France in 1916–17, attached to XIV Corps.

=== Disbandment ===
The regiment was retitled 21st Lancers (Empress of India's) in 1921 and shortly thereafter disbanded as part of the post-War reduction in forces, though a cadre was briefly resurrected in 1922 in order to amalgamate with the 17th Lancers, to form the 17th/21st Lancers.

== Regimental museum ==
The regimental collection is held at The Royal Lancers and Nottinghamshire Yeomanry Museum which is based at Thoresby Hall in Nottinghamshire.

== Battle Honours ==
The regiment's battle honours were as follows:

- Khartoum (Battle of Omdurman)
- The Great War: N.W. Frontier India 1915-16

Note: the latter honour was awarded in September 1922 (after amalgamation).

== Victoria Crosses ==
- John Berryman, Sergeant - Crimean War, 25 October 1854
- John Farrell, Sergeant - Crimean War, 25 October 1854
- Thomas Byrne, Private - Sudan Campaign, 2 September 1898
- Raymond de Montmorency, Lieutenant - Sudan Campaign, 2 September 1898
- Paul Aloysius Kenna, Captain - Sudan Campaign, 2 September 1898
- Charles Hull, Private - First World War, 5 September 1915

== Regimental Colonels ==
Colonels of the regiment were:

3rd Bengal European Light Cavalry

- 1858–1862: Lt-Gen. William Pattle, CB

21st Regiment of Hussars (1852)

Transferred to British Army, 1852

- 1862–1865: Lt-Gen. Sir John Bennet Hearsey, KCB
- 1865–1880: Gen. William Parlby

21st Hussars (1877)

- 1880–1882: Gen. Hon. James William Bosville Macdonald, CB
- 1882–1886: Gen. Sir Charles John Foster, KCB
- 1886–1902: Gen. Sir Robert White, KCB

21st (Empress of India's) Lancers (1898)

- 1902–1909: Maj-Gen. Sir Alexander James Hardy Elliot, KCB
- 1909–1916: Maj-Gen. Sir Frederick William Benson, KCB
- 1916–1919: Maj-Gen. Arthur Henry Taylor
- 1919–1921: Gen. Hon. Sir Herbert Alexander Lawrence, GCB (to 17th/21st Lancers)
- 1921: Disbanded
- 1922: Reformed and amalgamated with 17th Lancers (Duke of Cambridge's Own) to form the 17th/21st Lancers

== See also ==
- British cavalry during the First World War
- 21st Light Dragoons
- White mutiny

== Sources ==
- Chant, Christopher (2013). The Handbook of British Regiments. Routledge Revivals. ISBN 978-0415710763.
- Jenkins, Roy (2001). Churchill: A Biography. Farrar, Straus & Giroux. ISBN 978-0-374-12354-3.
- Pakenham, Thomas (1992). The Scramble for Africa. Abacus. ISBN 0-349-10449-2.
- Raugh, Harold E. (2004). The Victorians at War, 1815-1914: An Encyclopedia of British Military History. ABC-CLIO. ISBN 978-1576079256.
