= Léonard Gautier =

French composer (1866–1955)

Jean Léonard Louis Anton Gautier (12 July 1866 – 27 October 1955) was a German-born French composer famous for his simple eighth-note melody piano piece called Le Secret which at one time appeared in all of the popular piano anthologies and still continues appearing in current famous piano collection pieces such as The Piano Bench of Classical Music.

Gautier was born in Altona, Hamburg, the eldest of eight children born to circus operator Jean-Baptiste-Anton-Bernardin-Marie Gautier and Marie-Honorine Monseiller Gautier. He was married to Emelina Albertine Rosalie Loyal and brother of Louis Frederik Gautier.

Select compositions:

- Le Secret (Intermezzo Pizzicato No. 276) (1916): versions exist for piano solo, piano trio, piano and violin, woodwind trio and many more
- La Bergeronette
- Twilight Whispers
- The Fairie Wand Waltz (1893)
- My Hope My All in All
- Salut d'amour (Exercise no. 3)
- Oh Dem Golden Slippers (Polka)
- Alerte! (Marche Militaire)
- The Fairie Barque (1913)
- Pretty Maidens (Danse Gracieuse)
