= Pinchas =

Pinchas, Pinhas (Hebrew: פנחס), or Pinkas (Hebrew: פנקס) is a Jewish given name derived from the biblical name Phinehas. Notable people with the name include:

== Pinchas ==
- Pinchas Abramovich
- Pinchas Ben-Porat
- Pinchas Biberfeld
- Pinchas Burstein
- Pinchas Cohen Gan
- Pinchas David Horowitz
- Pinchas Freudiger
- Pinchas Goldhar
- Pinchas Goldschmidt
- Pinchas Goldstein
- Pinchas Gutter
- Pinchas HaKohen Lintup
- Pinchas Hacohen Peli
- Pinchas Hirschprung
- Pinchas Horowitz
- Pinchas Kehati
- Pinchas Kohn
- Pinchas Lapide (1922–1997), Jewish theologian and Israeli historian
- Pinchas Litvinovsky
- Pinchas Menachem Alter
- Pinchas Menachem Justman (1848–1920), Hasidic rabbi and publisher of the Jerusalem Talmud
- Pinchas Mordechai Teitz
- Pinchas Polonsky
- Pinchas Rosen
- Pinchas Sadeh (1929–1994), Polish-born Israeli novelist and poet
- Pinchas Sapir (1906–1975), Israeli politician
- Pinchas Shapiro of Koretz
- Pinchas Steinberg
- Pinchas Stolper
- Pinchas Toledano
- Pinchas Zukerman (born 1948), Israeli-American violinist, violist and conductor
- Pinchas ben Yair

== Pinhas ==
- Pinhas Alpert
- Pinhas Golan
- Pinhas Hozez (born 1957), Israeli basketball player
- Pinhas Inbari
- Pinhas Khalifa Ha-Cohen Azogh
- Pinhas Kopel
- Pinhas Lavie
- Pinhas Lavon (1904–1976), Israeli Politician, Defence minister and Labour leader. Known for the infamous Lavon affair.
- Pinhas Minkowsky
- Pinhas Rubin
- Pinhas Rutenberg
- Pinhas Scheinman
- Pinhas Tzabari
- Pinhas Zaltzman

== Other ==
- Pinkas Braun (1923–2008), Swiss actor
- Pinkhos Churgin (1894–1957), first President of Bar-Ilan University

== See also ==
- Phinehas (disambiguation)
- Pinchus
