= Phineas Bowles =

Phineas Bowles may refer to:

- Phineas Bowles (died 1722), British Army Major-General
- His son Phineas Bowles (1690–1749), British Army Lieutenant-General, MP for Bewdley 1735–41
