= Phineus (mythology) =

In Greek mythology, Phineus (/ˈfɪniəs, ˈfɪn.juːs/; Ancient Greek: Φινεύς, Ancient Greek: [pʰiː.neǔs]) was the name of the following figures:

- Phineus, an Arcadian prince as one of the 50 sons of the impious King Lycaon either by the naiad Cyllene, Nonacris or by unknown woman. He and his brothers were the most nefarious and carefree of all people. To test them, Zeus visited them in the form of a peasant. These brothers mixed the entrails of a child into the god's meal, whereupon the enraged Zeus threw the meal over the table. Phineus was killed, along with his brothers and their father, by a lightning bolt of the god.
- Phineus (son of Belus), who was turned to stone by Perseus.
- Phineus, king of Thrace who was visited by Jason and the Argonauts.

== See also ==
- Phineus (disambiguation)
- Phineas (disambiguation)
- Phinehas (disambiguation)
