= General Bowles =

General Bowles may refer to:

- George Bowles (British Army officer) (1787–1876), British Army general
- Phineas Bowles (British Army officer, born 1690) (1690–1749), British Army lieutenant general
- Phineas Bowles (British Army officer, died 1722) (died 1722), British Army major general
- Robert Bowles (East India Company officer) (1744–1812), British East India Company major general
