= M3 scout car =

Type of armored car

M3A1 scout car
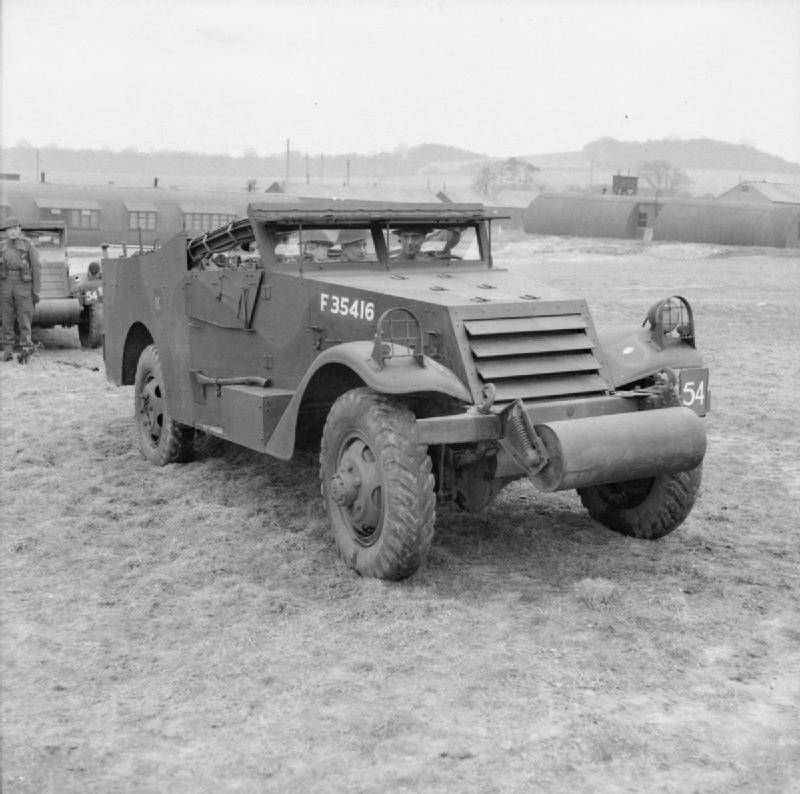
- M3A1 scout car in British Army service, 1942
- Type: Armored car
- Place of origin: United States

Service history
- In service: 1941-today
- Used by: See Operators
- Wars: World War II; Second Sino-Japanese War; Chinese Civil War; Hukbalahap Rebellion; Indonesian National Revolution; Greek Civil War; 1948 Arab–Israeli War; Costa Rican Civil War; 1958 Lebanon crisis First Indochina War; Algerian War; Laotian Civil War; Cambodian Civil War; Congo Crisis; Dominican Civil War; Portuguese Colonial War; Salvadoran Civil War

Production history
- Designer: White Motor Company
- Designed: 1939
- Manufacturer: White Motor Company
- Produced: 1939–1944
- No. built: 21,054 (M1: 76 + M2: 20 + M2A1/M3: 64 + M3A1: 20,918)

Specifications
- Mass: 6.25 short tons (5.67 t)
- Length: 18 ft 5 in (5.61 m)
- Width: 6 ft 8 in (2.03 m)
- Height: 6 ft 5 in (1.96 m)
- Crew: 8
- Armor: Maximum .5 in (13 mm)
- Main armament: .50 cal M2 Browning
- Secondary armament: 1–2 x .30 cal M1917 Browning or M1919 Browning machine guns
- Engine: Hercules JXD 6-cylinder in-line petrol 110 hp (82 kW)
- Drive: Wheeled 4x4
- Suspension: Leaf springs
- Fuel capacity: 30 US gal (110 L)
- Operational range: 250 mi (400 km)
- Maximum speed: 50 mph (80 km/h)
- References: Bishop & Foss

The M3 scout car (known as the White scout car in British Commonwealth service) was an American armored car produced in the World War II era, from 1939 to 1944. The original M3 scout car was produced in limited numbers, while the improved M3A1 scout car saw wide service during World War II and after.

== Design ==
The main production variant, the M3A1 scout car, was a lightly armored, open topped, machine gun armed, four wheel drive vehicle designed to be used in the reconnaissance role. The M3A1 scout car was crewed by a driver and commander, while there was seating for six additional occupants in the rear.

Powered by a Hercules JXD 6-cylinder in-line petrol engine delivering 110 hp (82 kW), the M3A1 Scout Car had a maximum road speed of 50 mph (80 km/h) and the 30 US gal (110 L) fuel tank gave a maximum range of 250 mi (400 km). The vehicle’s four wheel drive and bumper mounted unditching roller enabled it to cross a 1.5 ft (0.46 m) wide trench and climb a 1 ft (0.30 m) high step, maximum fording depth was 28 in (0.71 m).

The armored body of the M3A1 Scout Car was produced by the Diebold Lock and Safe Company. It had a maximum armor thickness of 0.5 in (13 mm) and was open topped, providing good fields of view but no overhead protection for the occupants, a canvas cover was provided for protection from the elements. The underside protection was also limited, giving little protection from the effects of land mines for the vehicle’s occupants.

The M3A1 Scout Car was typically armed with a .50 cal M2 Browning heavy machine gun and one or two .30 cal M1919 Browning machine guns, all mounted on a skate rail upon which the pintle mounts could be moved about. Due to its open top, the occupants were also able to employ their personal weapons.

== History ==
=== Development ===
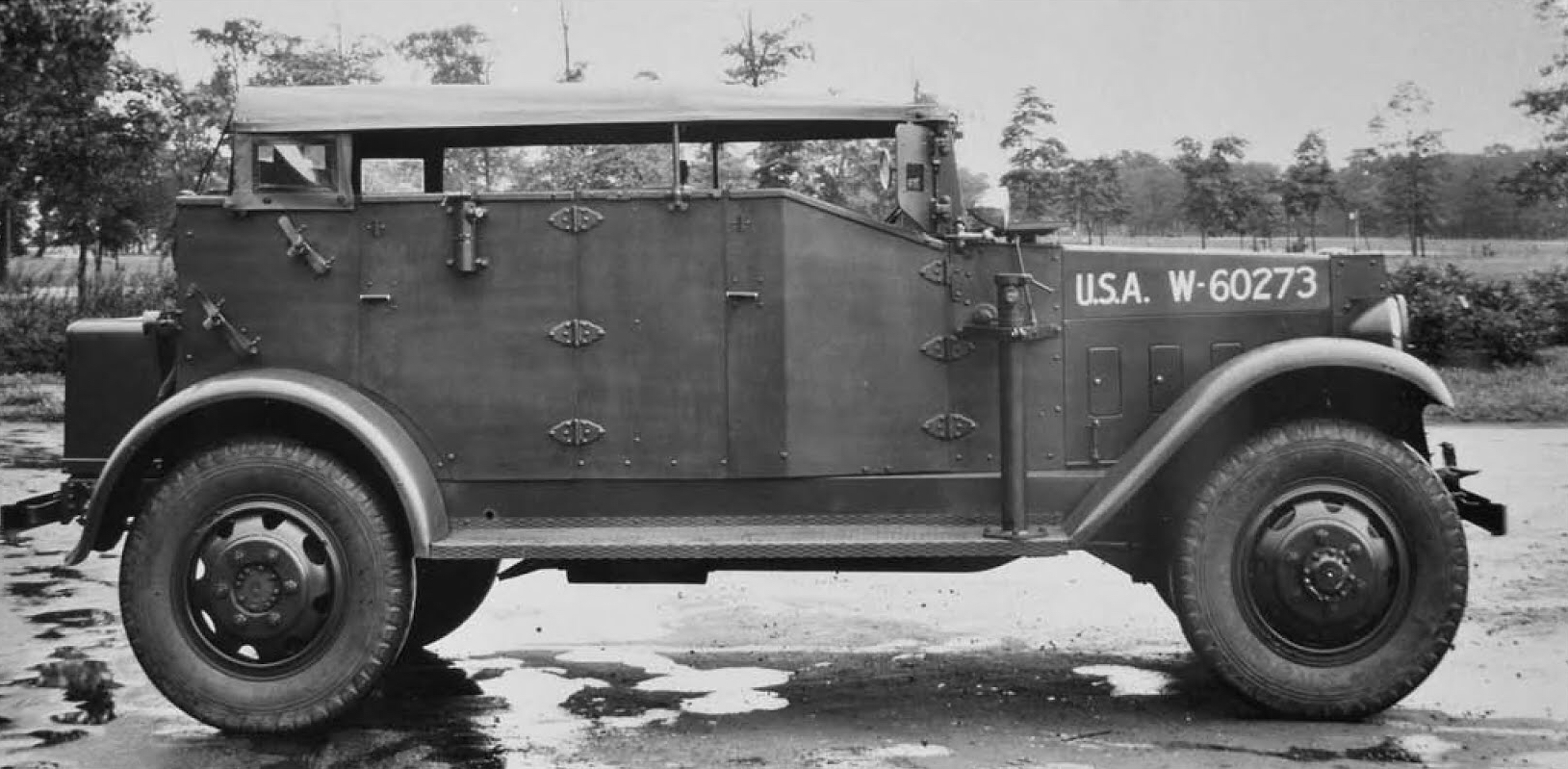
M1 Scout Car

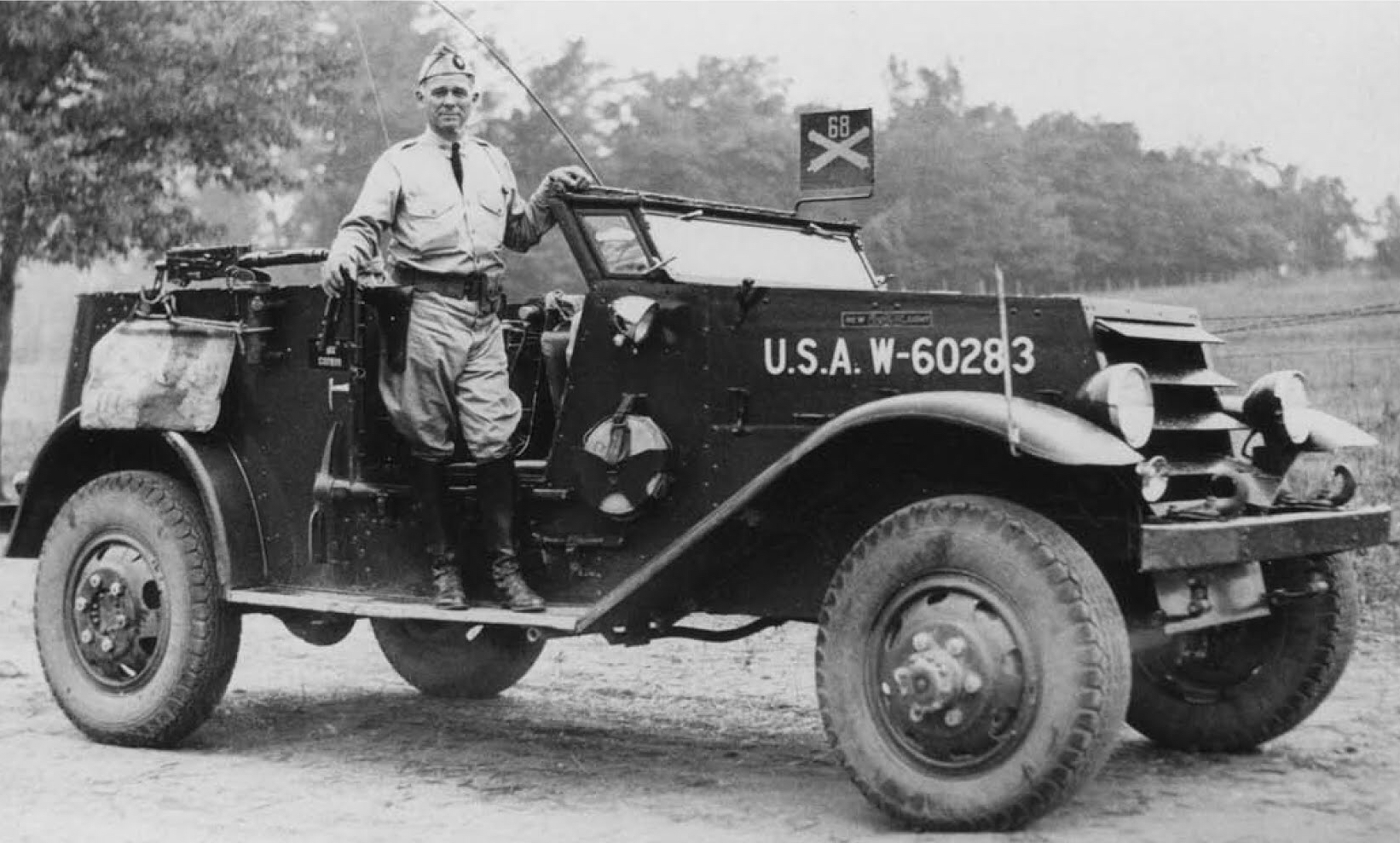
M2 Scout Car

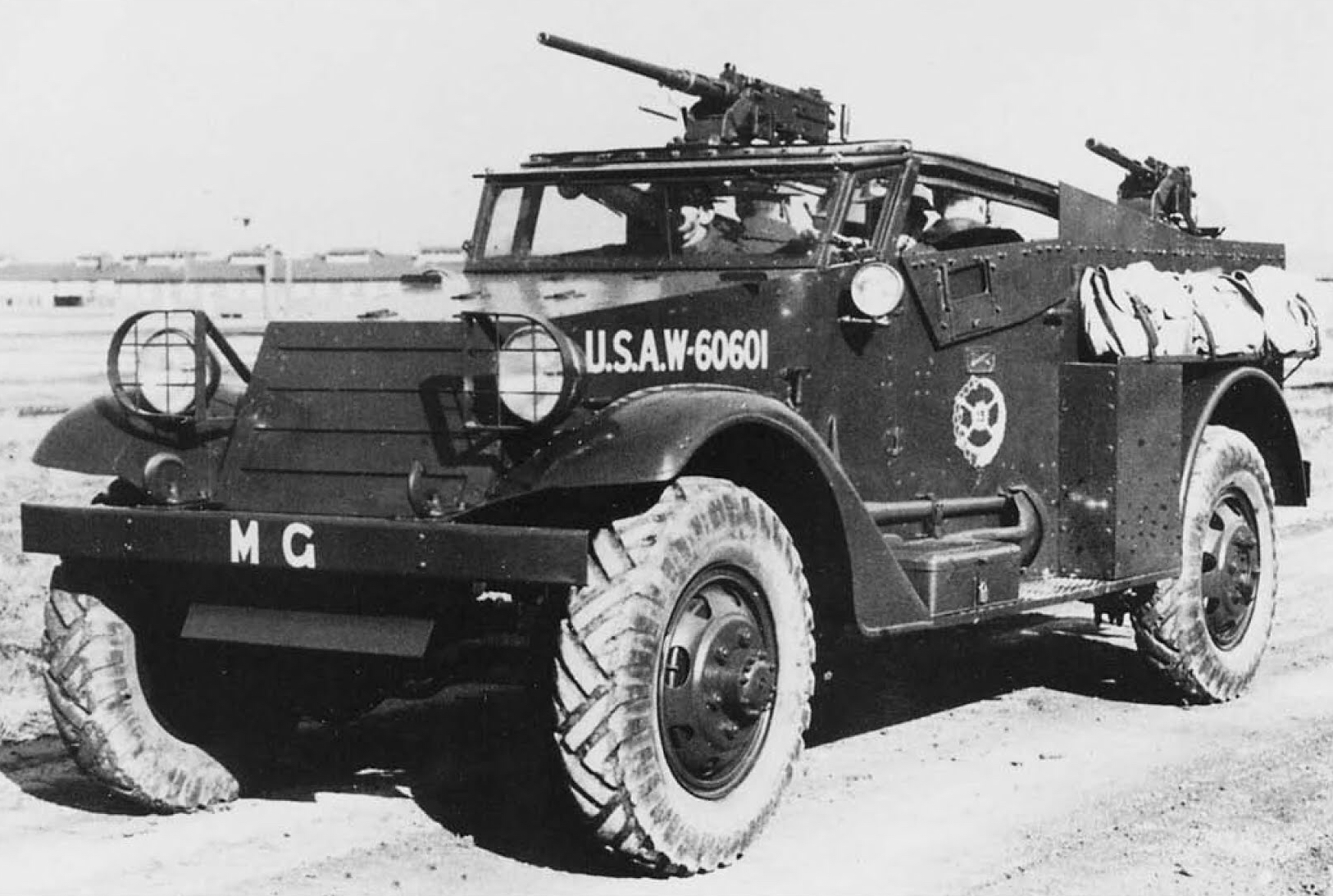
M2A1 / M3 Scout Car

M1 Scout Car

The M1 Scout Car was the first of a new series of armored cars developed by the White Motor Company for the US Army. Tested in 1934, the M1 Scout Car was an improvised, open topped four-wheel drive vehicle based on a commercial White ½-ton truck design. It weighed 3.85 short tons (3.49 t), was powered by a 75 hp (56 kW) engine, and had a top speed of 50 mph (80 km/h). The M1 Scout Car had a crew of four, a maximum armor thickness of 0.5 in (13 mm) and was armed with machine guns mounted on static mounts inside the vehicle. Seventy-six M1 Scout Cars were delivered to the US Army.

M2 Scout Car

The M2 Scout Car was a development of the M1, tested in 1935. The almost identical-looking M2 was larger and more powerful, and designed with as many commercial components as possible to keep costs down. It could accommodate a crew of seven. The M2 Scout Car weighed 3.95 short tons (3.58 t), was powered by a 94 hp (70 kW) engine and retained the top speed of 50 mph (80 km/h). Twenty M2 Scout Cars were delivered to the US Army.

M2A1 / M3 Scout Car

The M2A1 Scout Car, later redesignated the M3 Scout Car, was a further development of the M1 and M2 Scout Cars. The M2A1 / M3 Scout Car retained the 94 hp (70 kW) engine and had a top speed of 60 mph (97 km/h). Sixty-four M2A1 / M3 Scout Cars were produced, all being assigned to the 7th Cavalry Brigade.

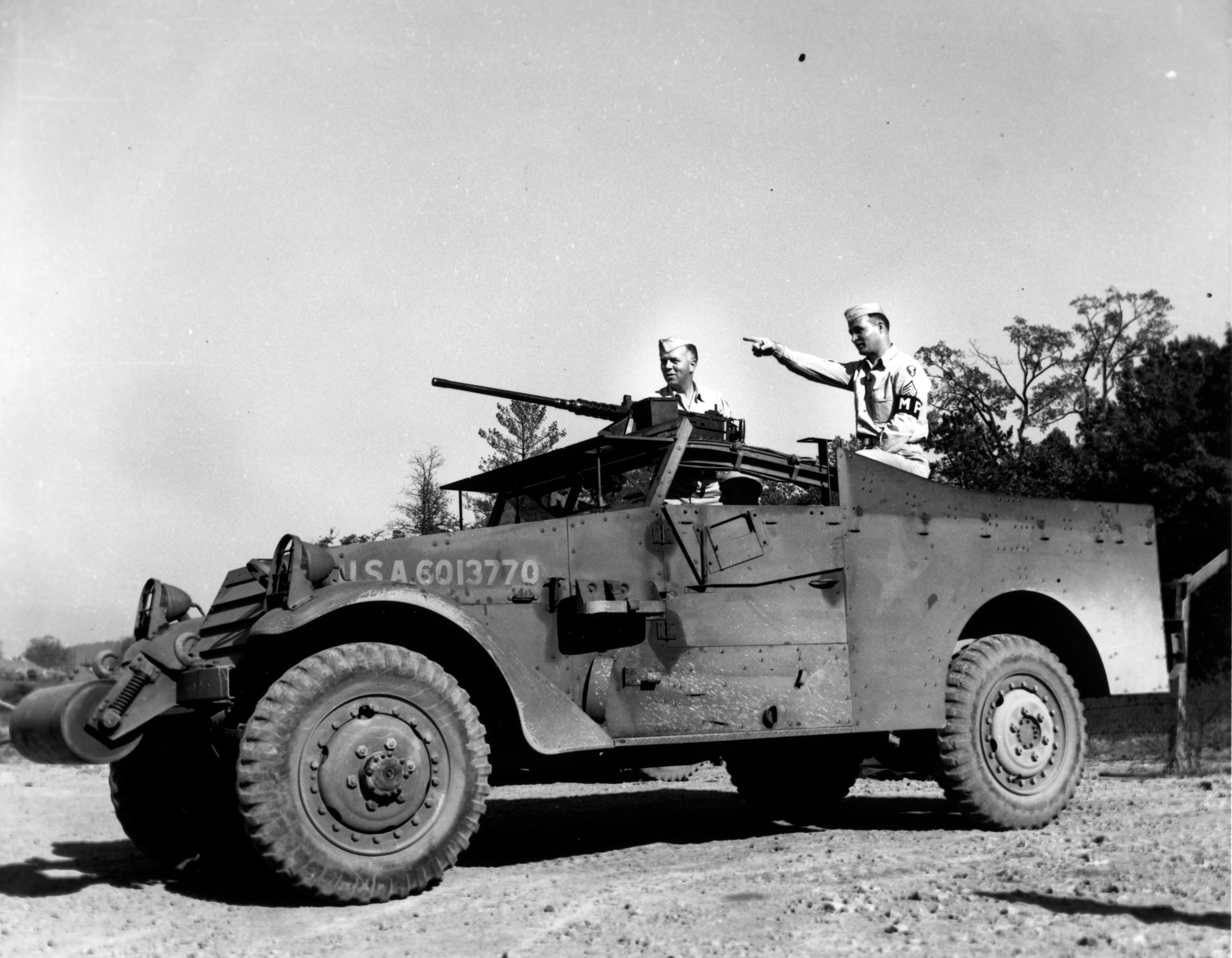
M3A1 Scout Car

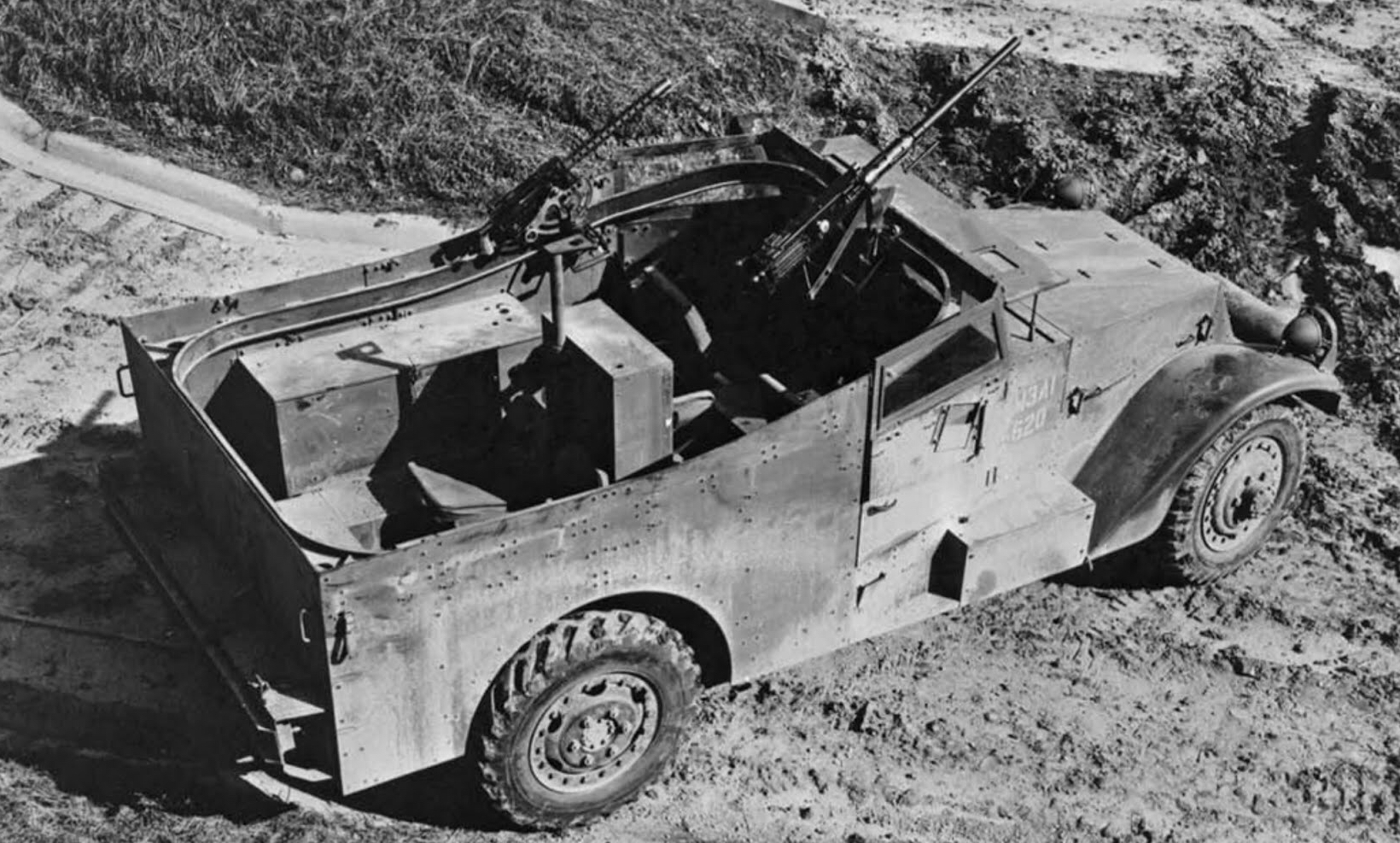
Interior of an M3A1

M3A1 Scout Car

The M3A1 Scout Car was the final development of the series. Primary external differences from the M3 were a widening of the body over the fenders, the removal of the rear door of the M3 and the addition of the front roller. Internally, the M3A1 had an improved engine and was fitted with the machine gun skate rail. A total of 20,918 were produced between 1939–1944. It was the only version to see service outside of the United States, with the exception of Philippine Scouts in the 26th Cavalry Regiment (PS) who were issued the M2 variant before 1937.

== Variants ==
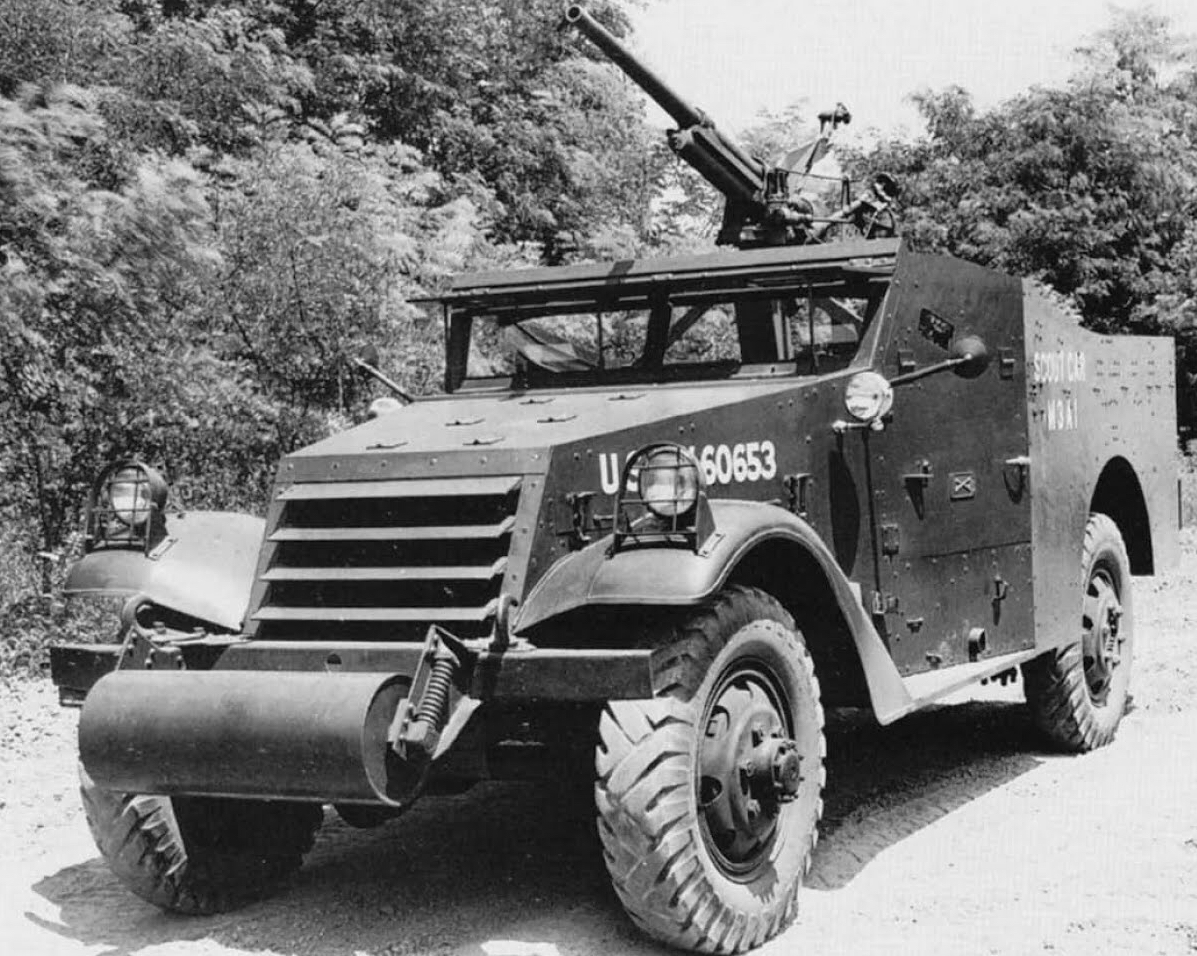
M3A1E3 with unditching roller and 37 mm Gun M3

The M3A1E1 Scout Car was developed to increase the range and fuel economy of the vehicle, it was powered by an 81 hp (60 kW) Buda-Lanova 6DT-317 six-cylinder diesel engine. 3,340 were produced, all were sent to the Soviet Union.

The M3A1E2 Scout Car was a version with an armored roof.

The M3A1E3 Scout Car was an experimental version fitted with a pedestal mounted 37 mm Gun M3.

The M3A1 Command Car was a command version, fitted with an armored screen and additional side armor.

The M2 Half Track was developed from the M3A1 Scout Car by adding half-tracks to the rear of the vehicle. The post-War BTR-40 was a Soviet development of the M3A1 Scout Car concept.

== Service ==
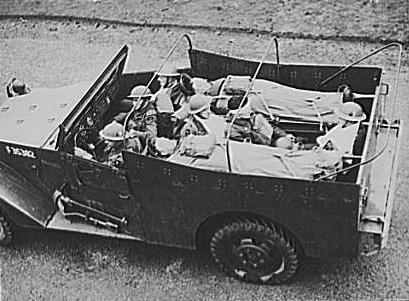
British White Scout Car being used as an ambulance

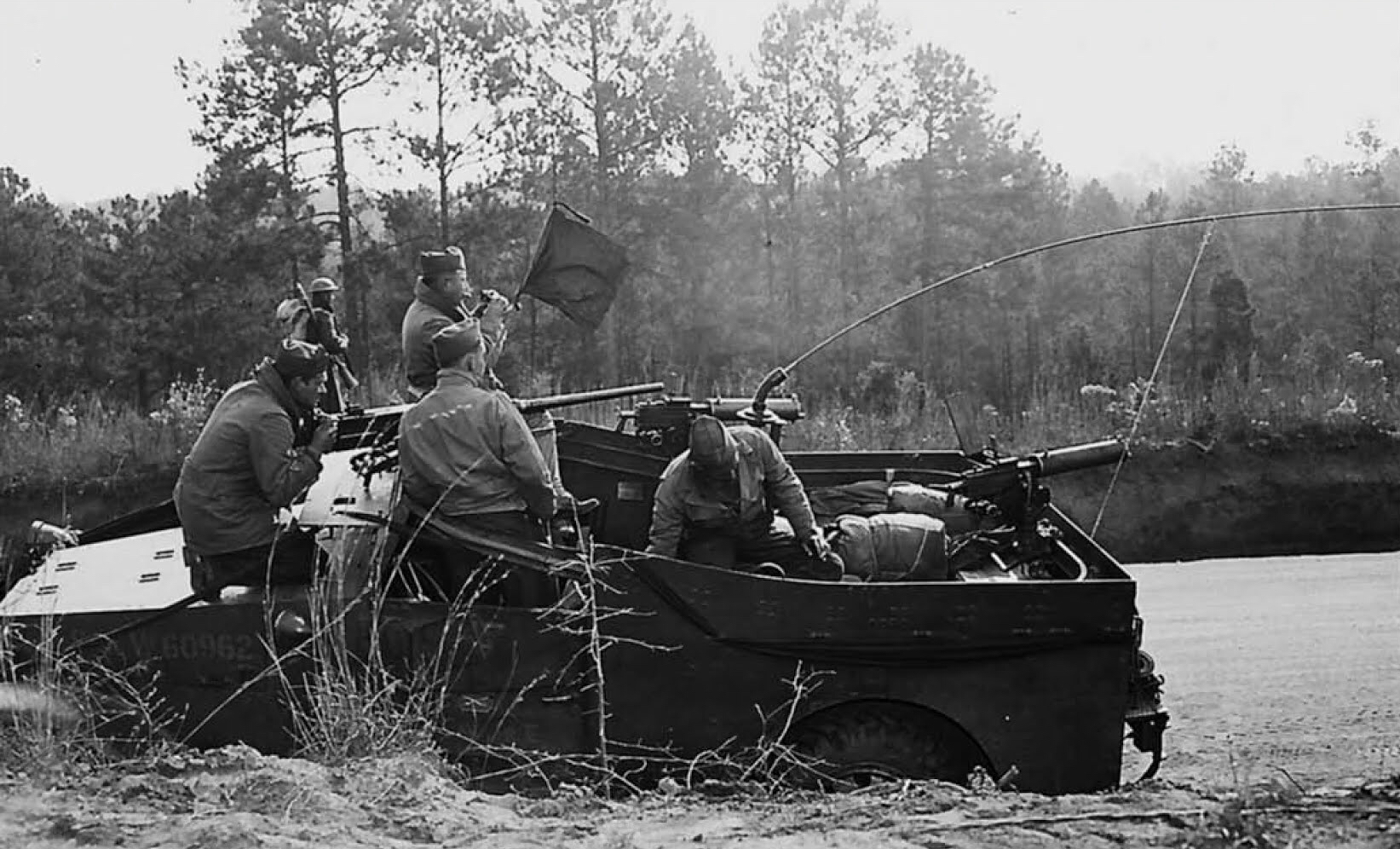
US Army M3A1 Scout Car

=== United States ===
The M3A1 was used by cavalry units of the US Army in its intended cavalry role during the North African campaign and the invasion of Sicily, being employed for reconnaissance, screening and as an armored command vehicle. The M3A1 was fast and reliable, making it popular with its crews. However, it was a major disappointment in its intended role, because of its poor off-road performance and its lack of overhead protection. Cavalry units were forced to supplement it with the M2 Half-Track Car and the larger M3 Half-tracks.

Throughout 1943, most US Army units replaced the M3A1 with the M8 Greyhound armored car and the similar M20 Utility Car, although the M3A1 was retained for rear area security and convoy escort duties. A small number of M3A1s were employed in the Normandy campaign. A few M3A1s were used by the US Marine Corps in the Pacific theater, but none saw combat.

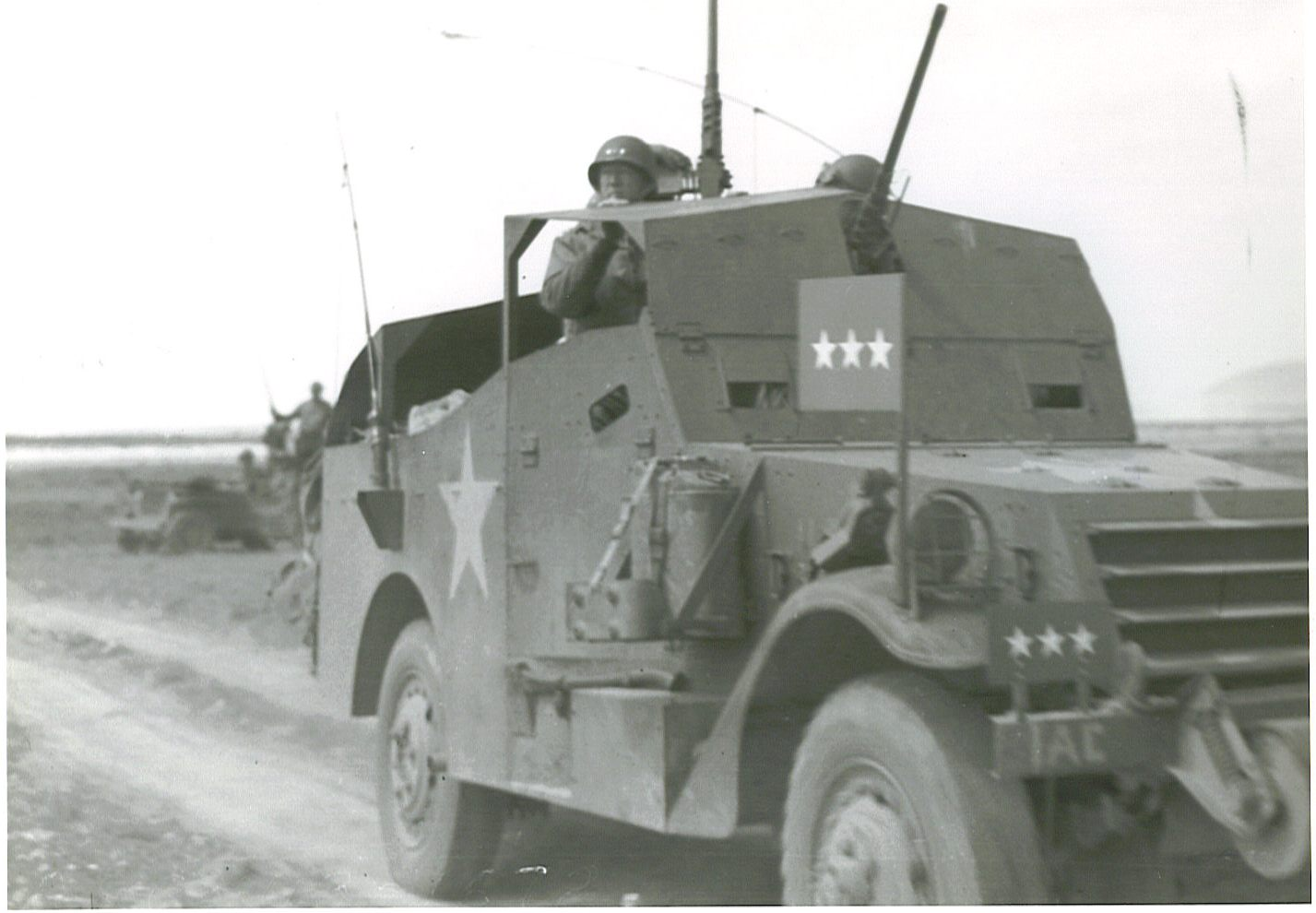
General George Patton's modified M3A1 Scout Car

General George Patton used an M3A1 as a command vehicle, modified with additional armor and a raised fighting compartment.

A total of 11,401 M3A1 Scout Cars were allocated for supply to US allies under the Lend-Lease policy; 6,987 were supplied to the British Commonwealth, 3,310 to the Soviet Union and 104 to the Chinese Nationalist Army. Some were also supplied to Free Belgian, Free French, Czechoslovak and Polish forces.

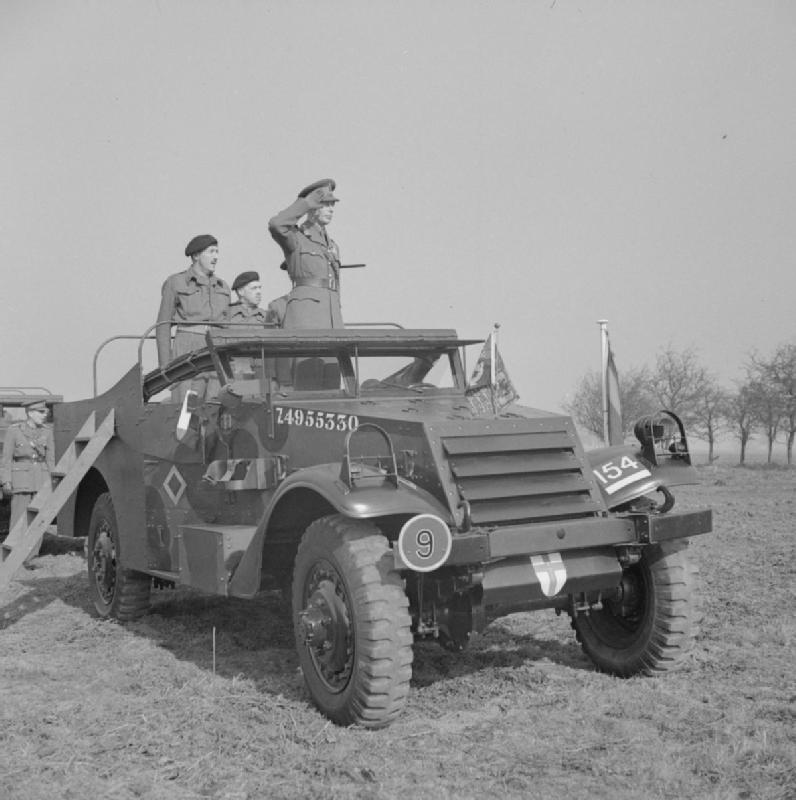
King George VI reviewing troops from a White Scout Car

=== Britain ===
In British Commonwealth service, the White Scout Car was regarded more as an armored truck, reflected in the designation "Truck, 15cwt, 4x4, Armoured Personnel", and was used in a variety of secondary roles, being issued to engineer, artillery (as an observation vehicle for field artillery observers), medical (as a protected ambulance) and signals units; within the Royal Armoured Corps’ Tank and Armoured Car Regiments, it usually served in Squadron or Regimental headquarters. It was used by British Commonwealth forces in every theatre they fought in except Burma.

=== Soviet Union ===
In Soviet Red Army service, the M3A1 was used as an armored personnel carrier by brigade and corps reconnaissance units and motorcycle battalions and regiments, operating alongside the BA-64 armored car. The M3A1 was also used as an armored command vehicle and a gun tractor for the ZIS-3 76-mm field gun, although the towing hitch proved to be unreliable, the M3A1 remained in widespread service throughout the war.

=== China ===
The Chinese Nationalist Army received M3A1 Scout Cars from 1942 and used them throughout the Second Sino-Japanese War and the Chinese Civil War.

=== Postwar service ===
After the war, many vehicles were sold, mostly to Asian and Latin American countries while they remained in Soviet service until 1947. A few vehicles were used by Israel in the 1948 Arab–Israeli War. At least one Israeli M3A1 was modified with top armor and a revolving turret. France employed its M3A1s in the First Indochina War and the Algerian War. The Madagascar Armed Forces still had M3s in service as of 2024.

== Operators ==
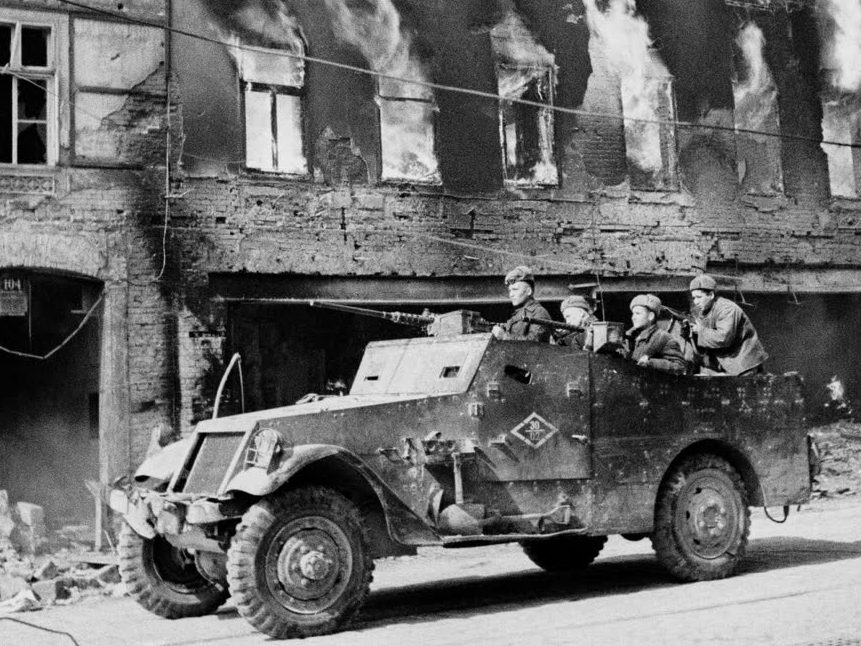
Soviet M3A1 of the 1st Guards Mechanized Corps, Vienna

Second World War

- Australia
- Belgium
- Canada
- Free Czechoslovakia
- Free France
- (Netherlands) Dutch East Indies – 40 vehicles, out of an order of 400, were delivered before the colony was overrun by Japan.
- China
- Nazi Germany – captured vehicles.
- New Zealand – M3A1s used by 2nd NZ Division engineering units.
- (Poland) Polish Armed Forces in the West
- USSR
- United Kingdom
- United States

Post-War

- Brazil – 100 M3A1
- Cambodia – 15 M3A1s used by the Cambodian Army in 1954–1975.
- China
- China – captured from the Chinese Nationalist Army during the Chinese Civil War.
- Chile
- Colombia
- Costa Rica
- Czechoslovakia
- Dominican Republic
- Dutch East Indies
- El Salvador
- France
- Greece
- Israel
- Katanga
- Kingdom of Laos – 19 M3A1s used by the Royal Lao Army during the Laotian Civil War (1954–1975).
- Lebanon – M3A1s used by the Regional Gendarmerie and the Lebanese Air Force in 1949–1959.
- Liberia
- Madagascar
- Mexico
- Norway
- Philippines
- Poland
- Portugal – M3A1s used by the Portuguese Army in Africa during the Portuguese Colonial War (1961–1974).
- South Vietnam
- USSR
- United Nations – captured Katangese vehicles used by ONUC forces.
- Venezuela
- Yugoslavia – 300 received during the Informbiro period.

== See also ==
- List of "G" series military vehicles

== Bibliography ==
- Berndt, Thomas (1993). Standard catalog of U.S. military vehicles, 1940–1965. Iola, Kansas: Krause Publications. ISBN 978-0-87341-223-0.
- Bishop, Chris (2006). The Encyclopedia of Tanks and Armoured Fighting Vehicles. Hoo, nr Rochester, Kent: Grange Books. ISBN 978-1-84013-907-5.
- Chant, Chris (2004). Tanks: Over 250 of the World's Tanks and Armoured Fighting Vehicles. Wigston, Leicester: Summertime Publishing Ltd. ISBN 1-85605-871-9.
- The Desert Rats Association. "Equipment Used By the Armoured Car Regiments". The Desert Rats Association.
- Foss, Christopher (2007). The Encyclopedia of Tanks and Armoured Fighting Vehicles. London: Amber Books Ltd. ISBN 978-1905704-44-6.
- David François, El Salvador – Volume 1: Crisis, Coup and Uprising 1970-1983, Latin America@War Volume 32, Helion & Company Limited, Warwick UK 2023. ISBN 978-1-804514-02-3
- David François, El Salvador – Volume 2: Conflagration 1984–1992, Latin America@War Volume 34, Helion & Company Limited, Warwick UK 2023. ISBN 978-1-804512-18-0
- Green, Michael (2017). Allied Armoured Fighting Vehicles of the Second World War. Barnsley, South Yorkshire: Pen & Sword Books. ISBN 978-1-47387-237-0.
- Green, Michael (2016). American Wheeled Armoured Fighting Vehicles. Barnsley, South Yorkshire: Pen & Sword Books. ISBN 978-1-47385-436-9.
- Imperial War Museum. "White Scout Car M3A1". Imperial War Museums.
- Forty, George; Livesey, Jack (2006). The World Encyclopedia of Tanks and Armoured Fighting Vehicles. London: Anness Publishing Ltd. ISBN 978-0754833512.
- PLAM.RU. "Бронетранспортёр МЗА1 "Скаут кар" (Armored personnel carrier M3A1 "Scout car")". Онлайн библиотека (Online library) PLAM.RU.
- Plowman, Jeffery (2007). Armor Camouflage & Markings of the 2nd New Zealand Division, Part 2: Italy. Havertown, Pennsylvania: Model Centrum Progres. ISBN 9788360672020.
- US War Department (1942). Technical Manual TM 9-705 Scout Car M3A1. Washington: War Department.
- Zaloga, Steven J. (25 January 2018). Early US Armor: Armored Cars 1915–40. New Vanguard 254. Osprey Publishing. ISBN 9781472825148.
