= Pinchus =

Pinchus, Pinhus (Hebrew: פנחס), or Pinkus (Hebrew: פנקס) is a Jewish given name derived from the biblical name Phinehas. Notable people with the name include:

- Pinchus Feldman
- Pinkus Frankl
- Pinchus Kahanovich, better known as Der Nister, Yiddish author, philosopher, translator, and critic
- Pinkus Kartin
- Pinchus Kremegne
- Pinkus Müller

== See also ==
- Phinehas (disambiguation)
- Pinchas
