= Phineas =

Phineas (/ˈfɪniəs/) is a masculine given name, an Anglicized name for the priest Phinehas in the Hebrew Bible. It may refer to:

== People ==
- Phineas Banning (1830–1885), American businessman and entrepreneur
- P. T. Barnum (1810–1891), American showman and businessman
- Phineas Bowles (died 1722), British Army major-general
- Phineas Bowles (1690–1749), British Army lieutenant-general and Member of Parliament; son of the above
- Phineas F. Bresee (1838–1915), American founder of the Church of the Nazarene
- Phineas Bruce (1762–1809), American politician
- Phineas Clanton (1843–1906), American Old West cattle rustler and brother of outlaws Billy and Ike Clanton
- Phineas Davis (1792–1835), American clockmaker and inventor who designed and built the first practical American coal-burning locomotive
- Phineas Fisher, an unidentified hacktivist
- Phineas Fletcher (1582–1650), Scottish-English poet
- Phineas Gage (1823–1860), American railroad construction foreman whose personality was changed by a brain injury
- Phineas Hitchcock (1831–1881), American politician
- Phineas Hodson (died 1646), Anglican clergyman and Chancellor of York from 1611 to 1646
- Phineas Jones (1819–1884), American politician
- Phineas Jenks (1781–1851), American doctor and politician
- Phineas C. Lounsbury (1841–1925), American politician and 53rd Governor of Connecticut
- Phineas W. Leland (1798–1870), American physician, journalist and politician
- Phineas Lovett (1745–1828), farmer, merchant, judge and political figure in Nova Scotia (now part of Canada)
- Phineas Lyman (1716–1774), colonial American soldier
- Phineas Newborn, Jr. (1931–1989), American jazz pianist
- Phineas Paist (1873–1937), American architect
- Phineas Pett (1570–1647), English shipwright
- Phineas Parkhurst Quimby (1802–1866), American religious teacher, philosopher, magnetizer, mesmerist, healer, inventor and writer
- Phineas Riall (1775–1850), British general and Governor of Grenada
- Phineas Ryrie (1829–1892), Scottish tea merchant in Hong Kong
- Phineas J. Stone (1810–1891), American politician
- Phineas L. Tracy (1786–1876), American politician
- Phineas White (1770–1847), American lawyer and politician
- Phineas Young (1799–1879), Mormon pioneer and missionary, older brother of Brigham Young

== Fictional characters ==
- Phineas Flynn, in Phineas and Ferb, an American animated television series
- Phineas Nigellus Black, from the Harry Potter series of novels
- Phineas Bogg, a main character in Voyagers!, an American television series - a parody of Phileas Fogg, a in Around the World in 80 Days
- Phineas T. Bluster, in The Howdy Doody Show, an American children's television show
- Phineas Finn, in Anthony Trollope's novels Phineas Finn and Phineas Redux
- Phineas T. Freak, in The Fabulous Furry Freak Brothers, an underground comic
- Phineas Phreak, a nickname of Luther Stickell's in Mission: Impossible
- Phineas Horton, a Marvel Comics character
- Phineas Mason, the Tinkerer, a Marvel Comics character
- Phineas Sharp, a villain in Darkwing Duck, an American animated television series
- Phineas Welles, a mad scientist in The Outer Worlds, an action role-playing game
- Phineas J. Whoopee, a know-it-all in Tennessee Tuxedo and His Tales, an American animated television series
- Phineas, in Allies in Power Rangers: Mystic Force
- Phineas or Fyneas, in the 1959 novel A Separate Peace
- Dr. Phineas Mogg, in My Life as a Teenage Robot, a 2003 animated series

== See also ==
- Finneas, American singer-songwriter, record producer, and actor
- Phineas Priesthood, Christian identity movement
- Phinehas (disambiguation)
- Phineus (disambiguation)
- Philip
