= Phineus (disambiguation) =

Phineus is a Greek mythological king of Thrace, visited by Jason and the Argonauts.

Phineus may also refer to:

- Phineus (son of Belus), turned to stone by Perseus
- Phineus, one of the sons of Lycaon, king of Arcadia
- Phineus (insect) a genus of shield bugs in the subfamily Discocephalinae

== See also ==
- Phineus (mythology)
- Phineas (disambiguation)
- Phinehas (disambiguation)
