= Harry Sebee Linfield =

Rabbi

Harry Sebee Linfield, aka H.S. Linfield (Hebrew: הרב צבי הירש לינפעלד, romanized: Zvi Hirsch Linfield; 31 October 1888 – 24 November 1978) was a 20th-century demographer and statistician of the Jewish people.

Linfield was also a rabbi, author and historian who produced publications for the American Jewish Committee, the Bureau of Jewish Social Research and the Jewish Statistical Bureau, amongst other organizations.

A primary focus of his work was exploring the role and nature of Jewish life in America and quantifying its size, the ways in which it changed over time, and the manner in which it impacted American culture. He also studied Jewish demographic trends worldwide. He did so through abstracting information from government and private sources, including the US, English, French, German, Hebrew and Yiddish press.

A "Special Agent" for the US Census Bureau quantifying statistics on Jews in America, Linfield nevertheless thought that the US Government should not ask individuals their personal religious beliefs or treat citizens differently due to their religion. He believed that capturing such data could be used directly or indirectly to persecute Jews, or members of other religious groups. Concerning the attempted effort to include this data in the 1960 US Census, Linfield said: "we see a complete denial of the principle of equal treatment of all religious groups in government records, and a threat to the liberties of all religious groups."

== Biography ==
Born in Birzai, Russian Empire in 1889, Linfield was the son of a leading Lithuanian Rabbi, Pinchas HaKohen Lintup. Linfield studied Talmud starting at the age of ten. In 1905, he immigrated to the United States.

Linfield received his bachelor's degree in Philosophy from the University of Chicago in 1914, and his Doctorate in Philosophy from the University of Chicago in 1919.

Linfield also received his rabbinical ordination from Hebrew Union College in 1918. His dissertation was entitled: The Relation of the Jewish Law on Interest to Babylonian Law.

Linfield served as a Resident Fellow at Dropsie College for Hebrew and Cognate Learning from 1918–1921. While at Dropsie, Linfield published an article entitled: The Dependence of the Talmudic Principle of Asmakhta on Babylonian Law (New Haven: Journal of the American Oriental Society, 1920, Volume 40, Pages 126–133). He also was editor of Max Margolis’ 646 page Notes on The New Translation of the Holy Scriptures (Philadelphia: 1921), which outlined the evidence upon which the 1917 Jewish Publication Society translation of the Holy Scriptures rested.

Starting in 1921 and through 1927, Linfield served as Director of information and statistics for the American Jewish Committee's (AJC's) Bureau of Jewish Social Research. Part of these efforts, starting in 1921 Linfield compiled and edited the American Jewish Committee's monthly entitled: Summary of Events of Jewish Interest. He also authored the "Statistics of Jews" section for several volumes of the AJC's American Jewish Year Book.

Beginning in 1926, he served as a “special agent” for Jewish statistical information for the United States Bureau of the Census. In this role he oversaw the Decennial Censuses of Religious Bodies in 1926, 1936 and 1946.

He continued this work directly for the American Jewish Committee from 1928–1932. He was hired to provide a statistical basis to aid the Committee's goals of: Dispelling inaccurate ideas about the Jewish people; spurring communal action on matters of import; and offering an accurate historical record of Jewish communal life. To these ends, he abstracted information and statistics across a broad array of topics of import to the Jewish community.

He then served as head of the Jewish Statistical Bureau, from 1932 until his retirement in 1978. Briefly, from 1940 to 1942 the Bureau was called the Statistical Bureau of the Synagogue Council of America (SBSCA).

In the 1940s a chief focus of Linfield's was working to ensure the US Government's Decennial Census not ask individuals any questions concerning their personal religious beliefs. In accordance with this focus, the SBSCA published a flier entitled: ”The Census Man Did Not Ask your Religion . . . Because . . .” This piece stated: “The Statistical Bureau proved that replies to a question on religion or belief would be unreliable and that such a census if ever taken would be unfair . . . Diligent and constant watching on our part is necessary to defeat the agitation for the introduction of a religious or racial classification in government statistics.”

Linfield received an honorary Doctorate of Divinity from Hebrew Union College in 1959. That same year, the Association of the Statisticians of American Religious Bodies presented him its Twenty-fifth Anniversary Award for “his outstanding contribution to the advancement of the statistical services of American Religious Bodies.””

Linfield married his wife Sadie (née Laporte) in 1916. They had four children: Three sons and one daughter. They remained married until his wife’s passing in 1972.

Linfield died on 24 November 1978 and is buried in Queens, New York.

== Demographic survey work ==
Linfield’s demographic focus was the Jewish community. He abstracted information including statistics about Jews from government and private sources worldwide. Beginning in 1922, Linfield published surveys of Jewish conditions in America and abroad, under the auspices of the American Jewish Year Book. This included his Communal Organization of the Jews in the United States, 1927, which ranged far beyond discussing individuals by addressing Jewish religious, educational and service organizations and institutions, that engaged in a broad array of cultural, philanthropic, civil rights and Zionistic activities central to the thriving of the Jewish community in the United States.

== Religious statistical analysis ==
On behalf of the American Jewish Committee, starting in 1921 Linfield published annual statistics concerning the Jewish community, including drafting the "Statistics of Jews" section of the American Jewish Year Book. Linfield's statistical writing continued until the 1970s. Beyond simply covering the number of Jews, his analysis addressed population distributions and migratory patternse, as well as numbers of synagogues and other Jewish organizations.

Sociologist Paul Burstein has noted:

“The most elaborate effort to collect data on Jewish organizations seems to have been made by H.S. Linfield of the Jewish Statistical Bureau in 1927. . . The 1927 study was not repeated and it is easy to imagine why. In 2000, the Research Department of United Jewish Communities attempted simply to find out the number of synagogues in the U.S. The researchers, Jim Schwartz and Jeffrey Scheckner, remarked that ‘The process was far more complicated and cumbersome than anticipated’ . . . The effort required to describe all, or even most, Jewish organizations would be truly staggering.”

On the basis of the information Linfield collected, the American Jewish Committee produced over 50 publications, with over 50,000 copies delivered during his 11 years at the AJC. Citations are available throughout AJC’s: The Work of the Statistical Department of the American Jewish Committee 1921–1932.

== Religious census work ==
In 1902 the US Census Bureau was established, and soon thereafter called for the creation of the Census of Religious Bodies – a census of all religious denominations in the country – to be conducted every 10 years.

In contrast with the decennial census which collects data about individuals, the religious bodies census collected data about religious organizations (such as the number of churches/synagogues, size of congregational membership, value of congregational property), by denomination and organized by state. The first stand-alone religious census was performed in 1906.

Linfield was named a “special agent” by the Census Bureau in order to perform the Census of Religious Bodies for the Jewish Community in 1926, which he did that year as well as in 1936 and 1946—though the 1946 census was never published due to Congress’ failure to appropriate funds for its tabulation or publication. Beyond statistical analysis, Linfield was asked to provide the “History, Doctrine, Organization, and Work” of the American Jewish community.

Having witnessed the persecution of Jews in Europe, including the pogroms and similar events pre-dating the Holocaust, Linfield believed the US Government should receive accurate overall statistics, yet neither solicit nor collect data from individuals as to their religious beliefs. He wanted to ensure that such information could not be used to identify, target or persecute individual Jews, or members of any other group, based on their religious faith. He pursued this effort through his work as Director of the Statistical Bureau of the Synagogue Council of America commencing in 1940.

This approach was noted by the Jewish Telegraphic Agency when it wrote concerning Linfield's census approach that:

“. . . the question was often posed as to whether it was possible to know the number and the distribution of the Jews in America, except through a question on religion in the schedule of the United States population census. The answer of the Statistical Bureau of the Synagogue Council was in the affirmative and is now for the first time corroborated by the U.S. Census Bureau, thus helping the Government to keep its statistics free of religious or racial classifications. “In the preface to this work, the United States Census Bureau writes as follows: ‘The enumeration of the Jewish Congregations resulting in the most complete statistics ever obtained as to the number and distribution of persons of Jewish faith in the United States, was made through a special agent, Dr. H.S. Linfield.’ This is the first time that the government has commented in this manner on private statistics of Jews.”

Congress abolished the Census of Religious Bodies entirely in 1957, and to the present day, the decennial census does not ask individuals their religion.

== Jewish publication indexing and other work ==
Linfield published between 1932 and 1937 a series of indexes of current magazine articles and books that were of interest to “vital aspects” of Jewish life. He also worked for over a decade to publish for the Jewish Publication Society a biblical guide entitled “Helps to the Study of the Holy Scriptures,” but it was never published. The galleys for a biblical concordance that Linfield created as a central component of this work, reside in the Jewish Publican Society's archive at Temple University.

== Archive ==
Together with many of his books, an archive of Linfield's papers from 1907 to 1978 are located in the New York's American Jewish Historical Society.

== Publications ==
In all, Linfield authored over 40 works in 98 publications extant in English and Hebrew. These works appear in 740 libraries worldwide. His works include:

- Summary of Events of Jewish Interest, Edited by Harry S. Linfield, (New York: American Jewish Committee, 1921- circa 1930)
- A Survey of the Year 5682: A Survey of Jewish Conditions in the United States and Abroad by HS Linfield (Philadelphia: American Jewish Year Book, 1922)
- A Survey of the Year 5683: September 1923 to September 1924 by HS Linfield (Philadelphia: American Jewish Year Book, 1923)
- A Survey of the Year 5685 by HS Linfield (Philadelphia: American Jewish Year Book, 1925)
- Statistics of Jews – 1925 by HS Linfield (New York: American Jewish Committee, 1926)
- Communal Organization of the Jews in Soviet Russia (New York: Jewish Communal Service Association of North America, 1925)
- Statistics of Jews - 1926 by HS Linfield (Philadelphia: American Jewish Year Book, 1926)
- A Survey of the Year 5686: A Survey of Jewish Condition in the United States and Abroad during August 1925 – March 1926 by HS Linfield (Philadelphia: American Jewish Year Book, 1926)
- Survey of Year 5687: A Survey of Jewish Conditions in the United States and Abroad During April 1926 – March 1927 by HS Linfield (Philadelphia: American Jewish Year Book, 1927)
- Statistics of Jews 1926: The Number of Jews in the United States and in Foreign Countries and Jewish Immigration, with an Appendix: The Jews of Hungary – Census of 1920 by HS Linfield (Philadelphia: <publisher unknown>, 1927)
- Statistics of Jews 1927: The Number of Jews in the United States and in Foreign Countries and Jewish Immigration by HS Linfield (Philadelphia: <publisher unknown>, 1928)
- The Jews in the United States, 1927 by HS Linfield (New York: American Jewish Committee, 1929)
- The Communal Organization of the Jews of the United States – 1927 by HS Linfield (Philadelphia: American Jewish Committee, 1929)
- Post-War Aspects of Jewish Migration by HS Linfield (New York: Jewish Communal Service Association of North America, 1930)
- Statistics of Jews - 1931 by HS Linfield (New York: American Jewish Committee, 1931)
- Jewish Migration as a Part of World Migration Movements 1920–1930 by HS Linfield (New York: <Publisher Unknown>, 1931)
- Hasid’s Index to Periodicals and Booklist: Current Magazine Articles and New Books on the Vital Aspects of Jewish Life by HS Linfield (New York: Jewish Statistical Bureau, 1932–37)
- Jewish Migration: Jewish Migration as a Part of World Migration Movements, 1920–1930 by HS Linfield (New York: Jewish Statistical Bureau, 1933)
- Digest of Events of Jewish Interest by HS Linfield (New York: Hasid Publishing Co., 1934)
- Statistics of Jews and Jewish Organizations, Historical Review of Ten Censuses 1850–1937 (New York: American Jewish Committee, 1937)
- State Population Census by Faiths, Meaning, Reliability and Value by HS Linfield (New York: Hasid's Bibliographic and Library Service, 1938)
- The Communal Census of Jews: Methods Used in Recent Years by HS Linfield (New York: Jewish Statistical Bureau, 1938)
- Statistics of Jews and Jewish Organizations: Historical Review of Ten Censuses, 1850–1937 by HS Linfield (New York: American Jewish Committee, 1939)
- Jewish Communities of the United States 1940 by HS Linfield (Philadelphia: American Jewish Committee, 1940)
- Report to the Delegates of the Council for Statistics of Jews and the National Committee of the Jewish Statistical Bureau by HS Linfield (New York: Jewish Statistical Bureau, circa 1940)
- Statistics of Jews – 1944 by HS Linfield (New York: American Jewish Committee, 1944)
- United States Census of Religious Groups and Census of Jewish Group: Interim Report to Delegates of Council for Statistics of Jews and National Committee of Jewish Statistical Bureau by HS Linfield (New York: Jewish Statistical Bureau, 1947)
- The Jewish People in the Federal Census of Religious Groups by HS Linfield (New York: <publisher unknown>, 1948)
- The Rabbis of the United States: Number of Rabbis, Rabbinical Training, Secular Education, Areas of Service by HS Linfield (New York: <publisher unknown>, 1957)
- Religion in Government Statistics: Demographic and Economic Statistics on Selected Religious Groups by HS Linfield (New York: Jewish Statistical Bureau, 1967)
- Statistics of Jews and Jewish Organizations: Historical Review of Ten Censuses, 1850–1937 by HS Linfield (San Francisco: R and E Research Associates, 1970)
- Necrology of Rabbis by HS Linfield (New York: Jewish Statistical Bureau, 1978)
