= 12th Royal Lancers =

British Army cavalry regiment

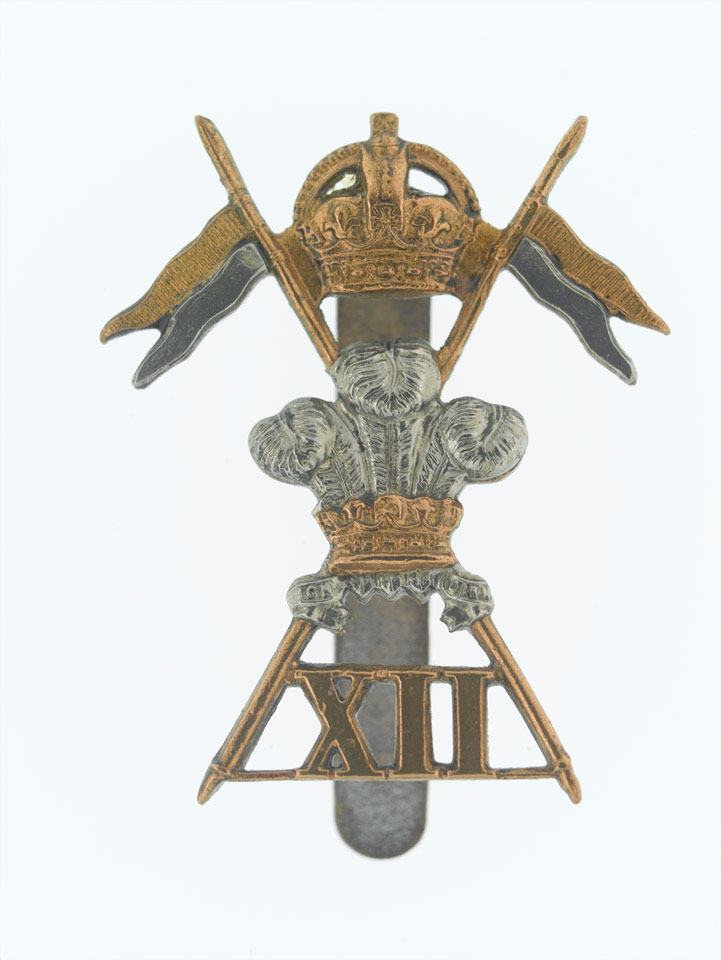
- 1902–1922 regimental cap badge
- Active: 1715–1960
- Country: Great Britain (1715–1800); United Kingdom (1801–1960)
- Branch: British Army
- Type: Line cavalry
- Size: One Regiment
- Nickname: The Supple Twelfth
- Motto: Ich Dien – I Serve
- March: Quick: God Bless the Prince of Wales; Slow: Coburg March

Commanders
- Notable commanders: Major-General Phineas Bowles (Sr) Lieutenant-General Phineas Bowles (Jr); Lieutenant-General Thomas Bligh; General Sir John Mordaunt; Lieutenant-General George Germain, 1st Viscount Sackville; Lieutenant-General Edward Harvey; General Sir William Pitt; Lieutenant-General William Keppel; General Sir William Payne-Gallwey; Lieutenant-General Sir Colquhoun Grant; Lieutenant-General Sir Hussey Vivian; Lieutenant General Robert Broadwood; Field Marshal William Birdwood, 1st Baron Birdwood General Sir Richard McCreery

The 12th Royal Lancers was a cavalry regiment of the British Army raised in 1715. Originally raised as dragoons, they converted to lancers after the Napoleonic Wars, and then to the armoured reconnaissance role in the 20th century. It saw service for three centuries, including the First World War and the Second World War. The regiment survived the immediate post-war reduction in forces, but was slated for reduction in the 1957 Defence White Paper, and was amalgamated with the 9th Queen's Royal Lancers to form the 9th/12th Royal Lancers (Prince of Wales's) in 1960.

== History ==
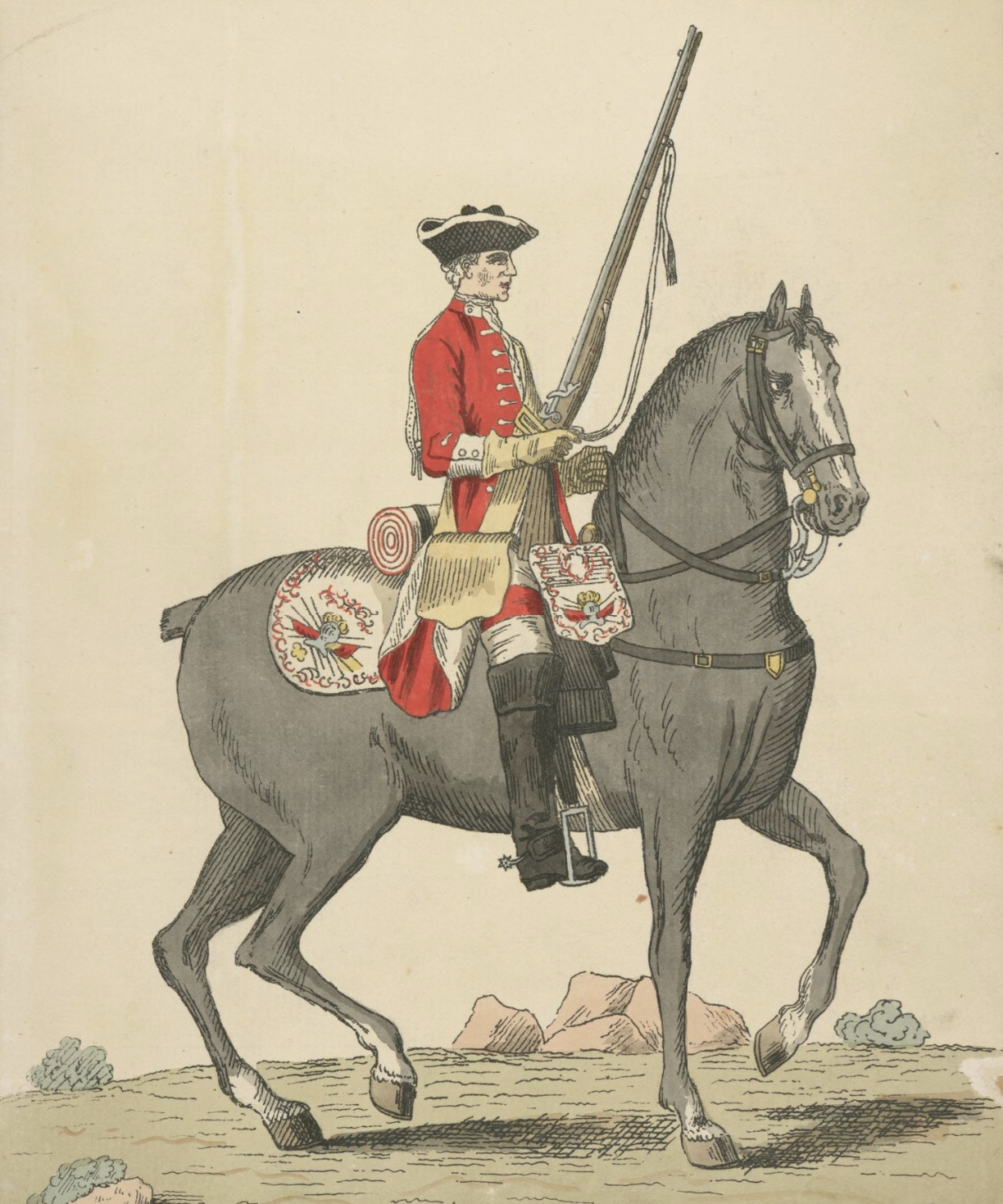
c. 1742 engraving of a regimental private

c. 1751 painting of a regimental private

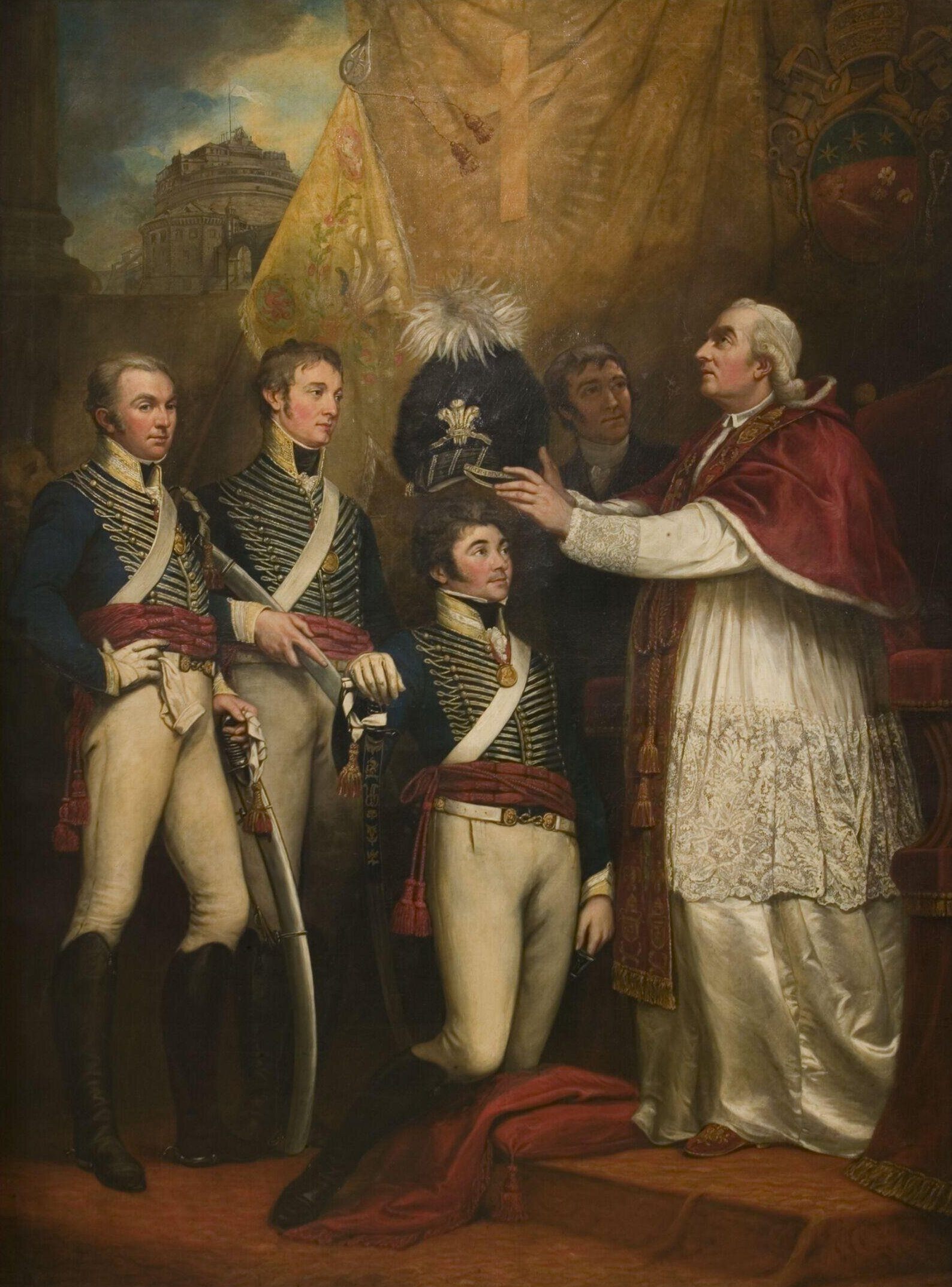
Three regimental officers being presented to Pope Pius VI in 1794

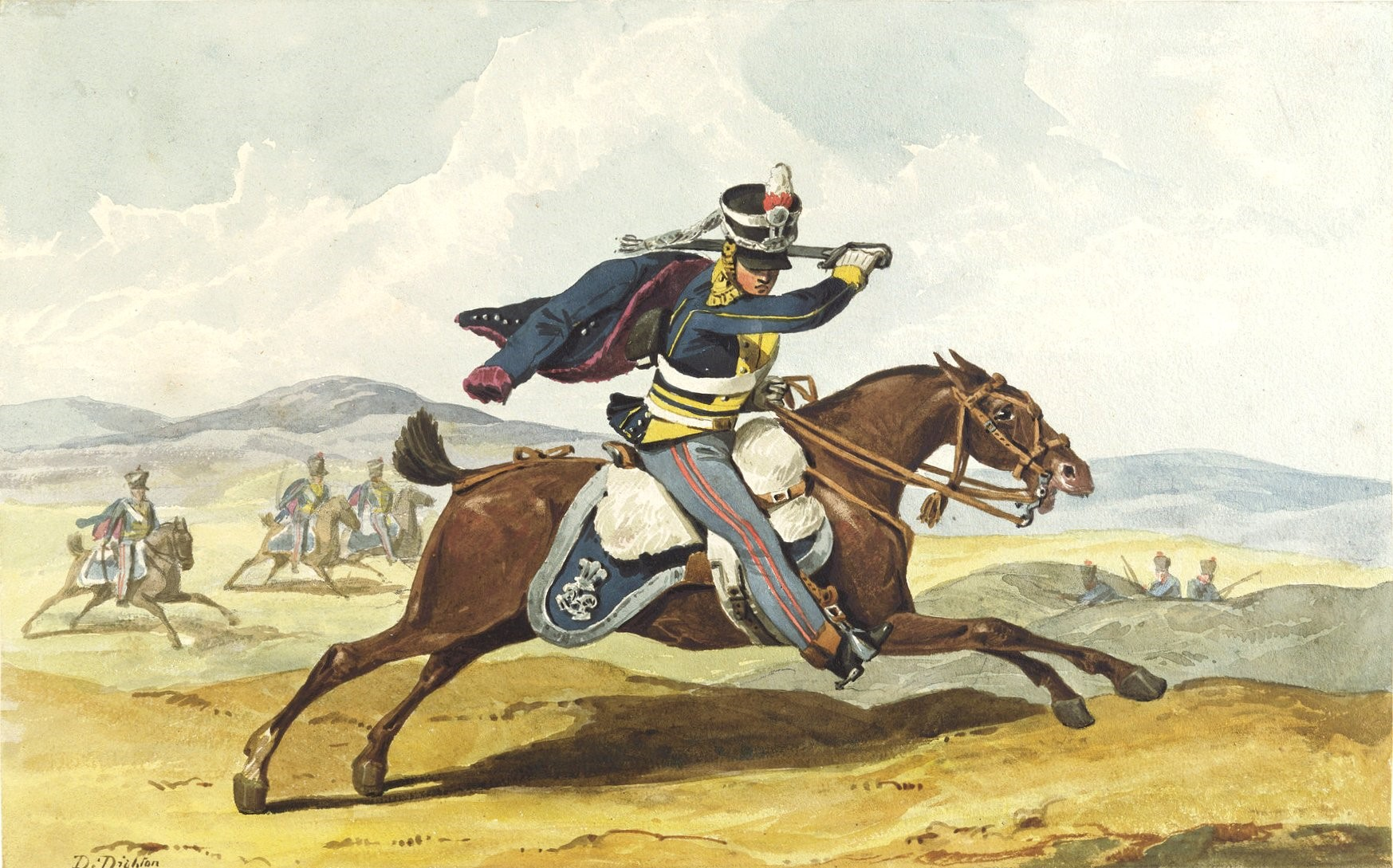
A regimental trooper in 1811

=== Early wars ===
A dragoon regiment was raised in Reading by Brigadier-General Phineas Bowles as Phineas Bowles's Regiment of Dragoons in July 1715 during the Jacobite rising of 1715. It was employed escorting prisoners to London later in the year. In 1718, the regiment was placed on the Irish establishment and posted to Ireland, where it remained for 75 years.

In 1751, the regiment was officially named the 12th Dragoons. In 1768, George III bestowed the badge of the Prince of Wales's feathers and the motto "Ich Dien" on the regiment, which was renamed the 12th (Prince of Wales's) Regiment of (Light) Dragoons. A young Arthur Wellesley joined the regiment as a subaltern in 1789. In April 1794, the regiment took part in the siege of Bastia during the invasion of Corsica. It was subsequently sent to Civitavecchia, and news of the regiment's good conduct there led Pope Pius VI to award gold medals to three of its officers.

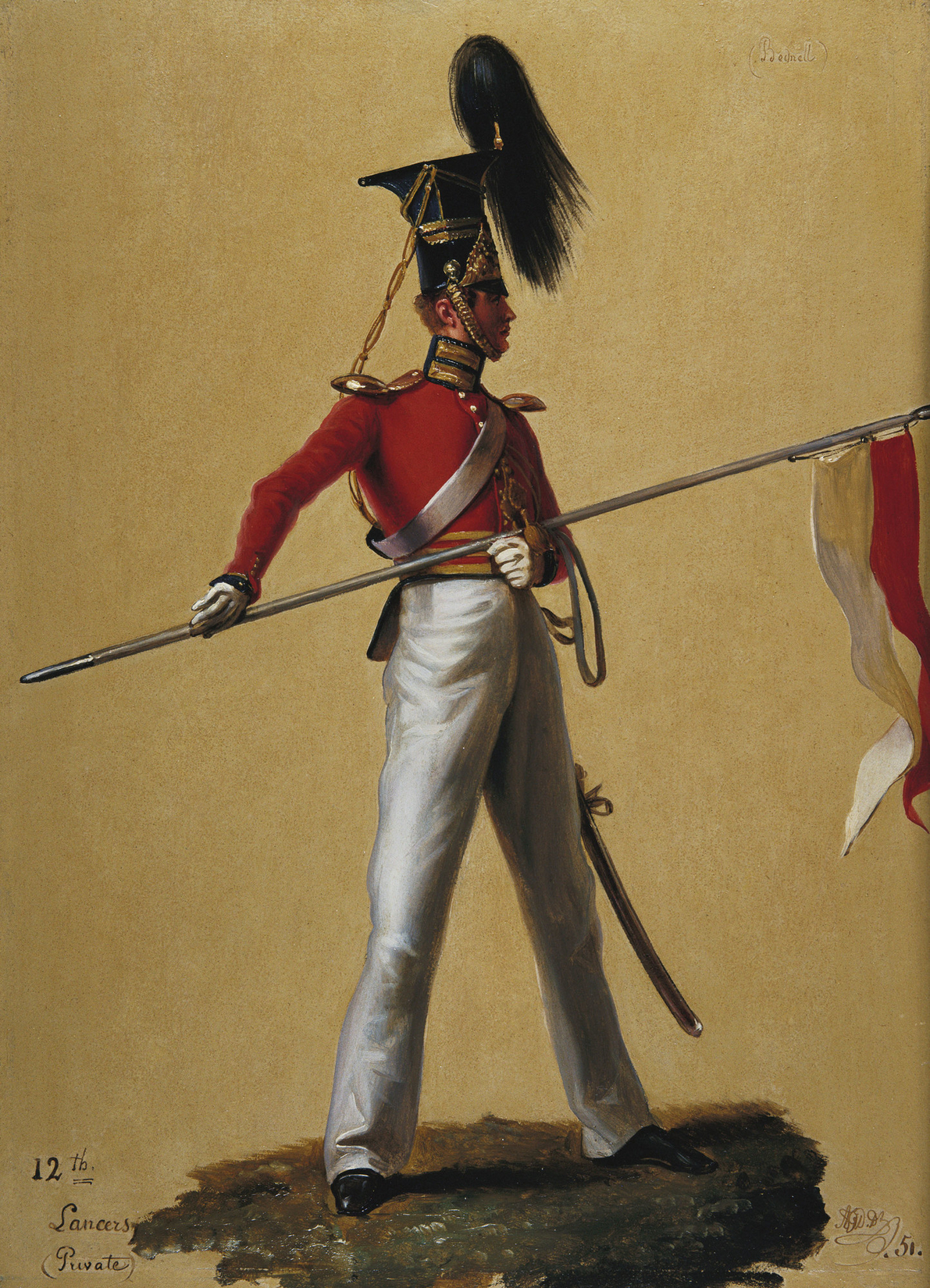
1832 painting of a regimental private

The regiment landed at Alexandria in March 1801 and, although its commanding officer, Lieutenant-Colonel Mervyn Archdall, was seriously injured in skirmishes, it saw action at the Battle of Alexandria later in the month. The regiment, under a new commanding officer, Lieutenant-Colonel John Doyle, captured 28 officers and 570 other ranks of the French Dromedary Regiment (French: Régiment de Dromadaires) in an action in the Egyptian desert in May 1801. It took part in the siege of Cairo securing the city in June 1801 and then participated in the siege of Alexandria taking that city in September 1801. The regiment next deployed for the disastrous Walcheren Campaign in autumn 1809.

In June 1811 the regiment embarked for Lisbon and, under the command of Colonel Frederick Ponsonby, took part in the siege of Ciudad Rodrigo in January 1812, the siege of Badajoz in March 1812 and the Battle of Villagarcia in April 1812 in the Peninsular War. It also undertook two charges at the Battle of Salamanca in July 1812 before taking part in the siege of Burgos in September 1812, the Battle of Vitoria in June 1813 and the siege of San Sebastián in autumn 1813. The regiment next advanced into France and supported the infantry at the Battle of Nivelle in November 1813. The regiment marched through France and arrived in Calais in July 1814 from where it returned to England.

In the Waterloo Campaign, the regiment was attached to Sir John Vandeleur's light cavalry brigade. At the Battle of Waterloo in June 1815, the regiment charged down the slope to support the Union Brigade of medium cavalry. Ponsonby fell, dangerously wounded, in the melee.

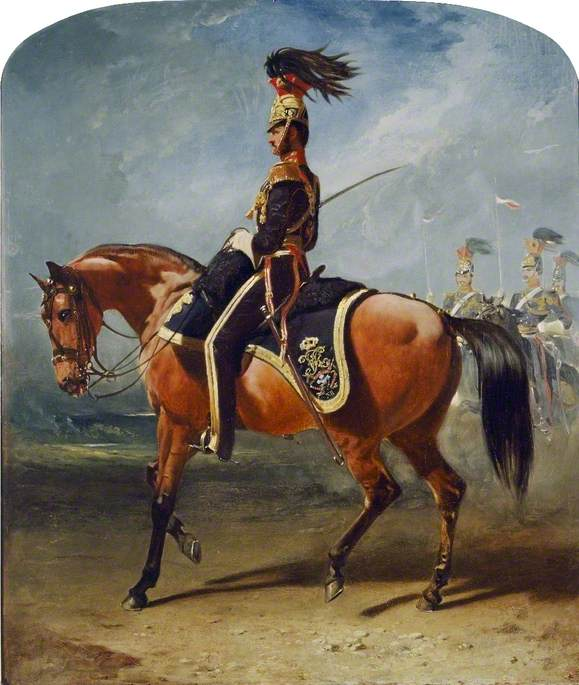
1848 painting of a regimental captain

In 1816, the 12th Light Dragoons was armed with lances after the cavalry of Napoleon's Army had shown their effectiveness at Waterloo and were re-titled 12th (The Prince of Wales's) Regiment of (Light) Dragoons (Lancers). In 1855, it reinforced the Light Cavalry Brigade in the Crimea after the Charge of the Light Brigade at the Battle of Balaclava. In 1861, the regiment was renamed 12th (The Prince of Wales's) Royal Regiment of Lancers. It was stationed in India between 1857 and 1860 in response to the Indian Rebellion and in Ireland from 1865 to 1870, before fighting in the Second Anglo-Afghan War in the late 1870s.

=== Boer War ===
The regiment was deployed to South Africa for service in the Second Boer War in October 1899, and took part in the relief of Kimberley and the ensuing Battle of Paardeberg in February 1900. The commanding officer of the regiment, the 11th Earl of Airlie, was killed at the Battle of Diamond Hill in June 1900. Following the end of the war in 1902 they went to India. Almost 530 officers and men left Cape Town aboard SS Lake Manitoba in September 1902, arriving at Bombay the following month and was then stationed at Ambala in Punjab.

=== First World War ===
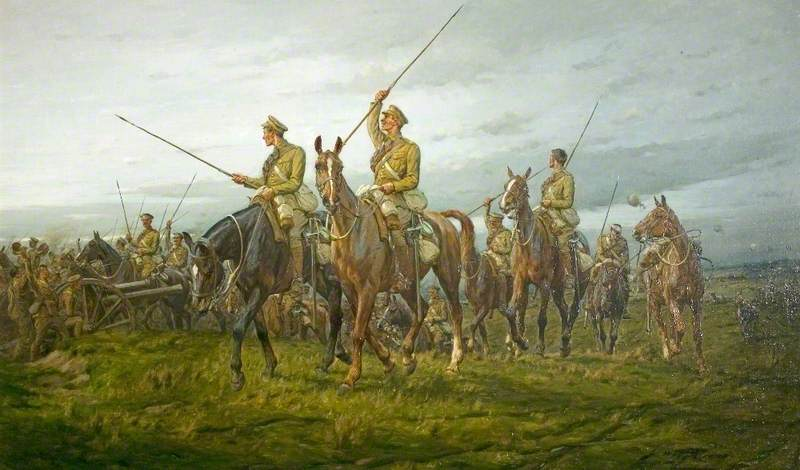
The regiment at Moy on 28 August 1914

The regiment, which had been based in Norwich at the start of the war, landed in France as part of the 5th Cavalry Brigade in the 2nd Cavalry Division in August 1914 for service on the Western Front. On 28 August 1914, 'C' Squadron of the 12th Lancers, led by Lieutenant-Colonel Frank Wormald, made a successful charge against a dismounted squadron of Prussian Dragoons at Moÿ-de-l'Aisne in the Great Retreat. The 9th/12th Royal Lancers celebrated Mons/Moy Day annually, which commemorated the last occasions on which each predecessor regiment charged with lances. Operating both mounted and as infantry, the regiment served on the Western Front throughout the war, participating in many of the major engagements, including the battles of Neuve-Chapelle, Cambrai and Amiens.

=== Inter-war era ===
In 1921 the regiment was re-titled the 12th Royal Lancers (Prince of Wales's). In 1928, it gave up its horses and was equipped with armoured cars, taking over vehicles left in Egypt by two Royal Tank Corps armoured car units, the 3rd and 5th Companies. Late in 1934, the 12th exchanged equipment and station with the 11th Hussars, taking over 34 Lanchester 6×4 armoured cars at Tidworth. Its strength would have been 12 officers and 141 other ranks, organised in a company headquarters and three sections, each with five cars. Total numbers were sixteen cars, six motorcycles, a staff car, four 3-ton (3 t) and seven 30-cwt (1,520 kg) lorries.

In January–February 1935 a provisional D squadron of the 12th Lancers with eight armoured cars served as a peacekeeping force in the Saar region. On 31 December B and C squadrons were sent again to Egypt with 29 armoured cars as a response to the Italian invasion of Abyssinia and strengthening garrisons in Libya. By the end of 1936 the squadrons were returned to Britain, where the regiment was re-equipped with Morris Light Reconnaissance Cars.

=== Second World War ===
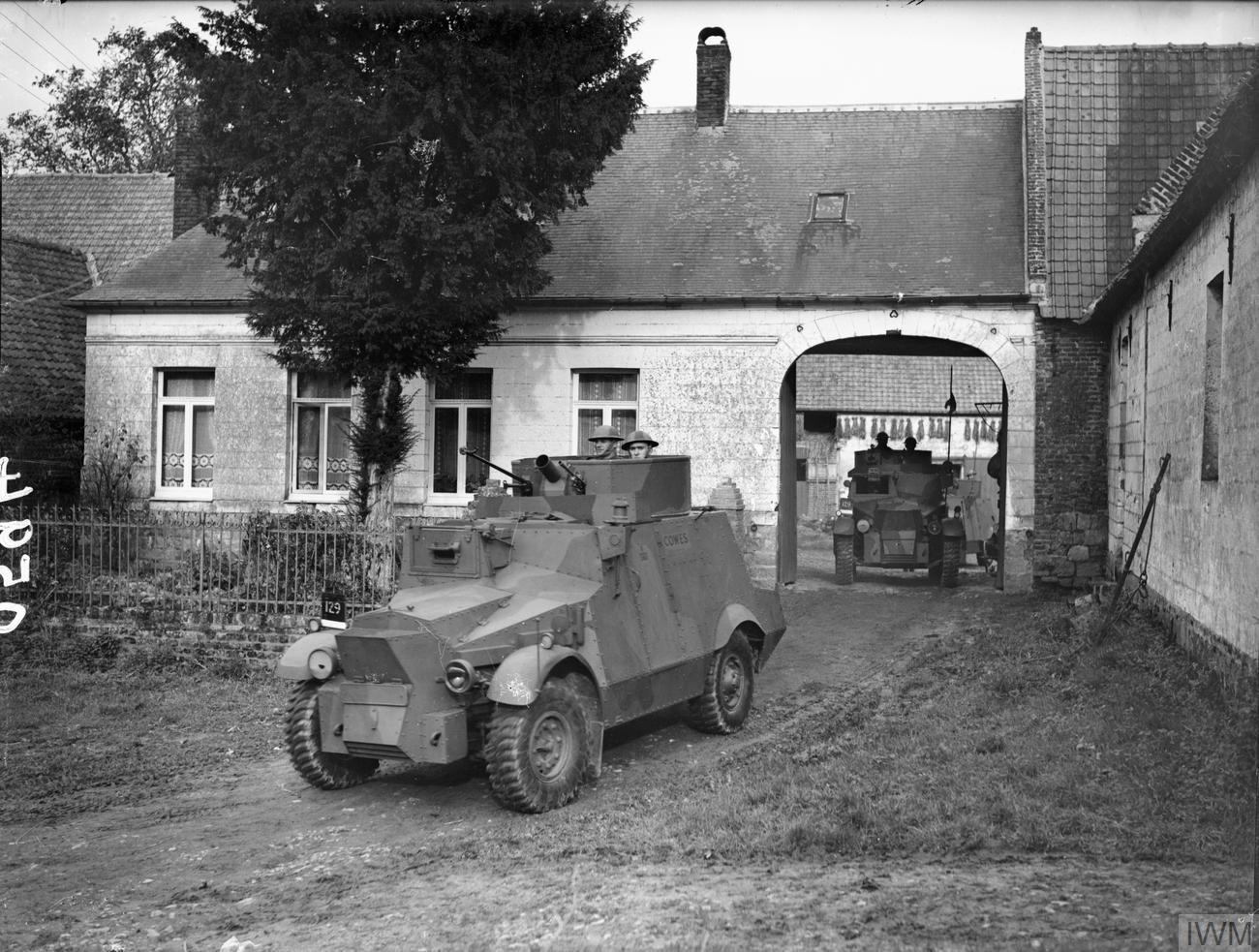
Morris CS9 armoured cars of the regiment, 29 September 1939

The 12th Lancers was an armoured car regiment equipped with the Morris CS9, in the 1940 campaign in France and Flanders, playing a key part in shielding the retreat to Dunkirk. After evacuation (without their vehicles) from Malo-les-Bains on dredgers, they were first equipped with Beaverettes, then, in June 1941, with Humbers.

The Lancers landed in Port Tewfik, Egypt, in November 1941. Subsequently, the regiment fought as divisional troops for the 1st Armoured Division at the Second Battle of El Alamein in October 1942 and then served as a corps-level reconnaissance unit in the Italian Campaign.

=== Post-war era ===
The regiment was deployed to Palestine in August 1946 before returning home in April 1947. It was sent to Malaya in September 1951 in the Malayan Emergency and, having been posted to Harewood Barracks in Herford in January 1955 moved on to Northampton Barracks in Wolfenbüttel in March 1956. It returned home again in March 1959 and deployed to Cyprus in May 1959. The regiment was amalgamated with the 9th Queen's Royal Lancers to form the 9th/12th Royal Lancers (Prince of Wales's) in September 1960.

== Regimental museum ==
The Derby Museum and Art Gallery incorporates the Soldier's Story Gallery, based on the collection, inter alia, of the 12th Royal Lancers.

== Battle honours ==
The regiment's battle honours were as follows:

- Early Wars: Egypt, Salamanca, Peninsula, Waterloo, South Africa 1851-2-3, Sevastopol, Central India, Relief of Kimberley, Paardeberg, South Africa 1899–1902
- The Great War: Mons, Retreat from Mons, Marne 1914, Aisne 1914, Messines 1914, Ypres 1914 '15, Neuve Chapelle, St. Julien, Bellewaarde, Arras 1917, Scarpe 1917, Cambrai 1917 '18, Somme 1918, St. Quentin, Lys, Hazebrouck, Amiens, Albert 1918, Hindenburg Line, St. Quentin Canal, Beaurevoir, Sambre, France and Flanders 1914–18
- The Second World War: Dyle, Defence of Arras, Arras Counter Attack, Dunkirk 1940, North-West Europe 1940, Chor es Sufan, Gazala, Alam el Halfa, El Alamein, Advance on Tripoli, Tebaga Gap, El Hamma, Akarit, El Kourzia, Djebel Kournine, Tunis, Creteville Pass, North Africa 1941–43, Citerna, Gothic Line, Capture of Forli, Conventello-Comacchio, Bologna, Sillaro Crossing, Idice Bridgehead, Italy 1944–45

== Colonel-in-Chief ==
- 1919–: F.M. HM King Edward VIII

== Regimental Colonels ==
Colonels of the regiment were:

- 1715–1719: Maj-Gen. Phineas Bowles (senior)
- 1719–1740: Lt-Gen. Phineas Bowles (junior)
- 1740–1743: Col. Alexander Rose
- 1743–1746: Brig-Gen. Samuel Walter Whitshed
- 1746–1747: Lt-Gen. Thomas Bligh
- 1747–1749: Gen. Sir John Mordaunt, KB
- 1749: Gen. Hon. James Cholmondeley
- 1749–1750: Lt-Gen. George Germain, 1st Viscount Sackville
- 1750–1763: Lt-Gen. Sir John Whitefoord, Bt.

12th Regiment of Dragoons (1751)

- 1763–1764: Lt-Gen. Edward Harvey
- 1764–1770: Gen. Benjamin Carpenter

12th (The Prince of Wales's) Regiment of (Light) Dragoons (1768)

- 1770–1775: Gen. Sir William Augustus Pitt, KB
- 1775–1782: Lt-Gen. Hon. William Keppel
- 1782–1791: Lt-Gen. Hon. George Lane Parker
- 1791–1815: Gen. Sir James Steuart, Bt., GCH
- 1815–1825: Gen. Sir William Payne, Bt.

12th (The Prince of Wales's) Royal Regiment of (Light) Dragoons (Lancers)

- 1825–1827: Lt-Gen. Sir Colquhoun Grant, KCB, GCH
- 1827–1837: Lt-Gen. Sir Hussey Vivian, 1st Baron Vivian, GCB, GCH
- 1837–1856: Gen. Sir Henry John Cumming, KCH
- 1856–1861: Lt-Gen. Sir Lovell Benjamin Badcock, KCB, KH

12th (Prince of Wales's Royal) Lancers (1861)

- 1861–1872: Gen. Sir George Henry Lockwood, KCB
- 1872–1879: Gen. Edward Pole
- 1879–1892: Gen. Thomas Hooke Pearson, CB
- 1892–1894: Lt-Gen. Edward Burgoyne Cureton
- 1894–1896: Maj-Gen. Robert Hale
- 1896–1902: Lt-Gen. Sir Arthur Lyttelton-Annesley, KCB, KCVO
- 1902–1909: Maj-Gen. John Cecil Russell, CVO
- 1909–1917: Lt-Gen. Robert Broadwood, CB
- 1917–1920: Maj-Gen. Walter Howorth Greenly, CB, CMG, DSO
- 1920–1951: F.M. Sir William Riddell Birdwood, 1st Baron Birdwood, GCB, GCSI, GCMG, GCVO, CIE, DSO

12th Royal Lancers (Prince of Wales's) (1921)

- 1951–1960: Gen. Sir Richard McCreery, GCB, KBE, DSO, MC (to 9th/12th Royal Lancers)
- 1960: Regiment amalgamated with 9th Queen's Royal Lancers to form 9th/12th Royal Lancers (Prince of Wales's)

== See also ==
- British cavalry during the First World War

== Sources ==
- Cannon, Richard (1842). Historical Record of The Twelfth, or The Prince of Wales's Royal Regiment of Lancers: containing an account of the formation of the Regiment in 1715 and of its subsequent services to 1842. J. W. Parker.
- Crow, Duncan (1972). British and Commonwealth Armoured Formations 1919–46. Profile Publications Ltd, Great Bookham. ISBN 978-0853830818.
- Edmonds, Sir James Edward (1922). Military operations, France and Belgium, 1914.
- Joslen, H. F. (2003) [1960]. Orders of Battle: Second World War, 1939–1945. Uckfield, East Sussex: Naval and Military Press. ISBN 978-1-84342-474-1.
- Richards, Walter (1895). Her Majesty's Army. Vol. 1. London: J.S. Virtue.
