= 2/11th Armoured Car Regiment (Australia) =

Australian Army armoured reconnaissance regiment

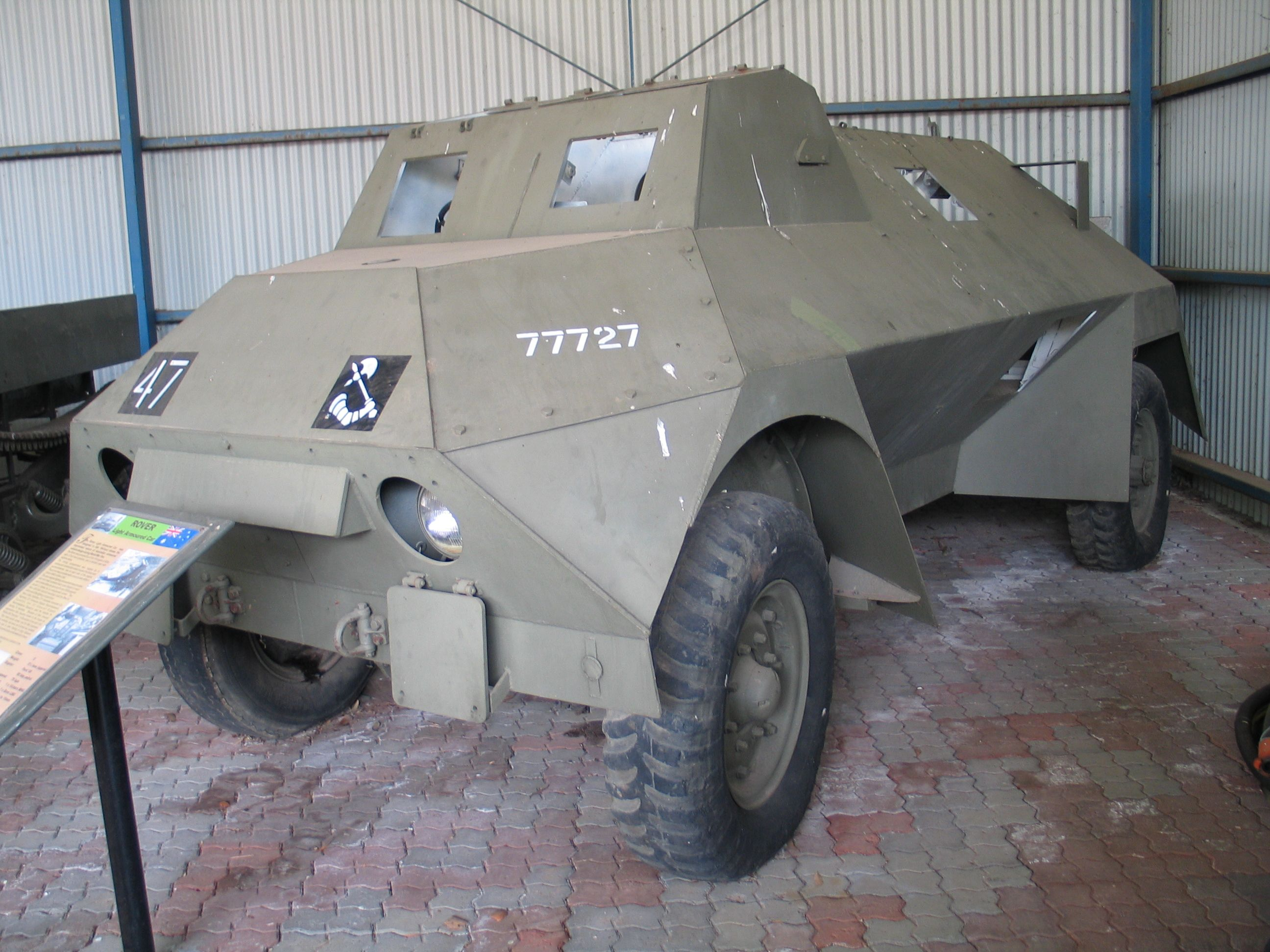
- A Rover Light Armoured Car in the 2/11th Armoured Car Regiment's markings
- Active: 1941–1944
- Country: Australia
- Branch: Australian Army
- Type: Armoured
- Part of: 1st Armoured Division; 2nd Infantry Division
- Battle honours: None

The 2/11th Armoured Car Regiment was an Australian Army armoured reconnaissance regiment of World War II. The regiment was formed in mid-1941 and was intended to be deployed to the Middle East. In late 1941, in response to the growing threat posed by Japan's entry into the war in the Pacific, it was employed in a defensive role to guard against a possible invasion of mainland Australia. It was disbanded in early 1944 without seeing action as part of the reduction of Australia's armoured forces and the reallocation of manpower to other formations more suited to jungle warfare.

== History ==
The 2/11th Armoured Car Regiment was formed in Cowra, New South Wales, during August 1941 as part of the 1st Armoured Division. Its first commanding officer was Lieutenant Colonel Edward Sheehan. The regiment was gradually brought up to full strength and was expanded to four "sabre" squadrons following the outbreak of the Pacific War, by which time Lieutenant Colonel Oliver Rennick took command, serving in that position for the remainder of the unit's existence. It had an authorised strength of over 1,000 personnel. On paper, it was allocated 12 scout cars and 58 armoured cars; however, or the first 11 months of its existence the regiment was equipped with a small number of obsolete Australian-built armoured cars which were suitable only for training purposes. In July 1942, these vehicles were replaced with more modern Australian designed vehicles such as the Rover Light Armoured Car and Dingo scout car.

Upon formation, the 1st Armoured Division was intended to serve in the Middle East, but following Japan's entry into the war following the attack on Pearl Harbor and the invasion of Malaya in December 1941, it was retained in Australia, as a key part of Australia's defensive plans to resist a potential invasion. The regiment participated in the 1st Armoured Division's large-scale exercises which were held near Narrabri, New South Wales in late 1942, at which time the division reached operational readiness. Following the Allied naval victory during the Battle of the Coral Sea and the successes elsewhere such as at Buna–Gona, the threat posed by Japanese forces to the Australian mainland decreased, and as a result the need for large armoured formations diminished. By this then, the Australian Army was suffering a manpower shortage, which resulted in a reallocation of resources and the gradual reduction of Australia's armoured units. In October 1942, the regiment was reduced in size when 'D' Squadron was used to form the 2/4th Armoured Regiment in Queensland.

In November 1942, the 2/11th Armoured Car Regiment moved to Western Australia (WA) with the 1st Armoured Division departing from Gunnedah and travelling via rail through Adelaide and crossing the Nullarbor Plain. During 1943, the regiment conducted reconnaissance patrols across much of WA. The regiment survived the 1st Armoured Division's disbandment in September 1943 and became part of the 2nd Infantry Division. Although the regiment was re-equipped with Staghound armoured cars in early 1944 it was disbanded in New South Wales in March or April 1944 at which time its personnel were transferred to other units more suitable for jungle warfare.
