= Pinhas Inbari =

Israeli correspondent

Pinhas Inbari (Hebrew: פנחס ענברי) is an Israeli correspondent who has reported on Palestinian affairs for Israel Radio and the newspaper Al Hamishmar, and currently for the Jerusalem Center for Public Affairs and several foreign media outlets. He has written several books and articles on the Palestinians, e.g. The Palestinians: Between Terrorism and Statehood.
