= Pinchas HaKohen Lintup =

Rabbi Pinchas HaKohen Lintup
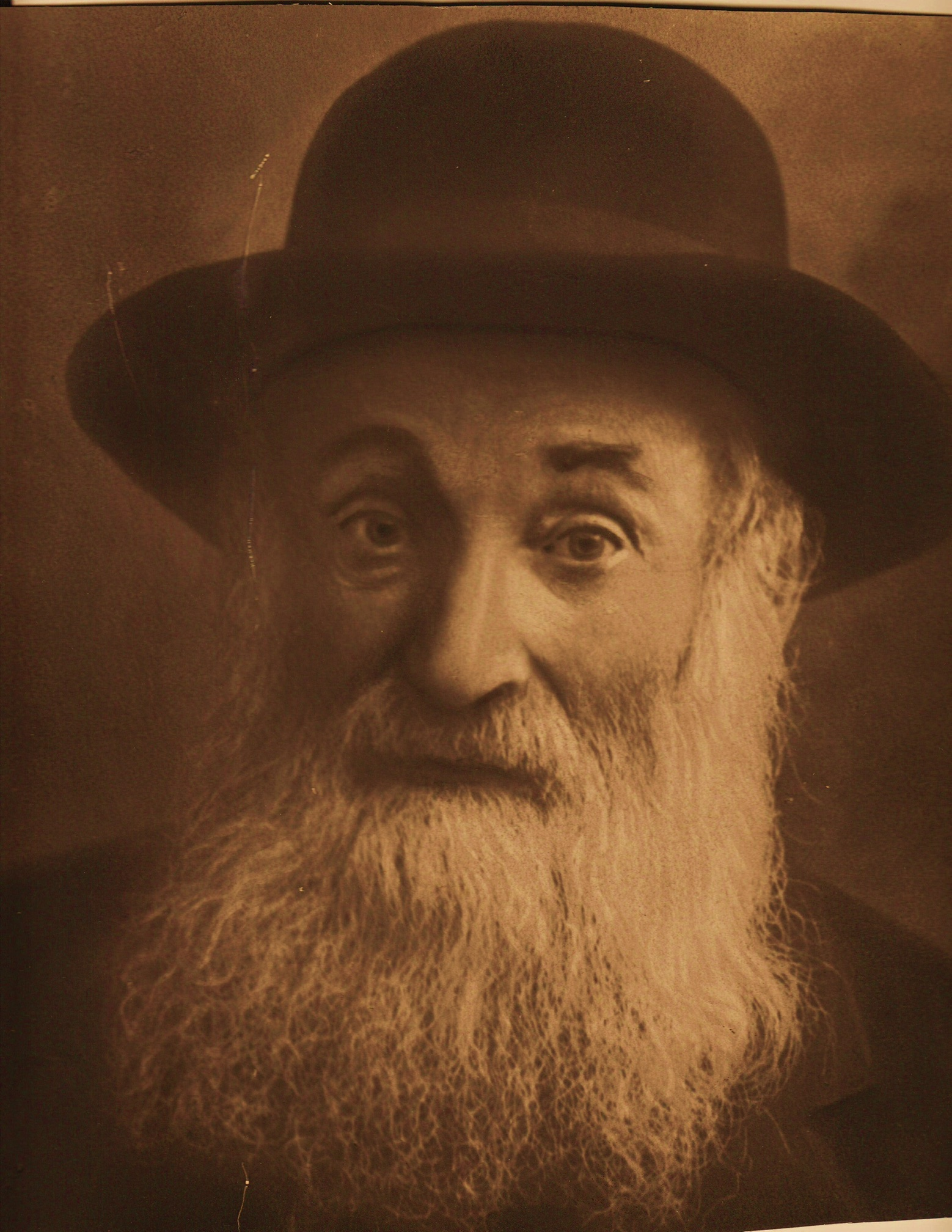

Personal life
- Born: 10 October 1851 Dvinsk
- Died: 1 June 1924 (aged 72) Biržai
- Buried: Biržai
- Spouse: Slova Kantzapovitch
- Children: 11
- Parent: Yehuda Leib HaKohen Lintup (father)

Religious life
- Religion: Judaism
- Denomination: Religious Zionism

Pinchas HaKohen Lintup or Pinhas HaKohen Lintop (Hebrew: הרב פנחס הכהן לינטופ, Lithuanian: Pinchas HaKohenas Lintupas) (10 October 1851 – 1 June 1924) was a Religious Zionist Lithuanian rabbi and teacher who served as the spiritual leader of the Hasidic community of Biržai.

In his work, Kana'uteh de-Pinhas, Bezalel Naor states that "Rabbi Lintop was unique in that he was one of only three major Lithuanian kabbalists in that country at the beginning of the 20th century: Solomon Elyashev, Abraham Isaac Hakohen Kook, and Pinhas Hakohen Lintop."

Lintup's life is discussed in several contemporary works, notably in Lee Shai Weissbach's translation of A Jewish Life on Three Continents by Lintup's student Menachem Mendel Frieden. His theological views and impact are presented in Bezalel Naor's translation, commentary and notes on The Legends of Rabbah bar Bar Hannah by Rav Kook. Lintup's extensive correspondence with Rabbi Abraham Kook is also excerpted in Naor's Kana'uteh De Pinhas, as well as Reuven Dessler's Shnos Dor Vdor - Volume 4.

Lintup was a supporter of the Mizrachi movement.

== Early life ==
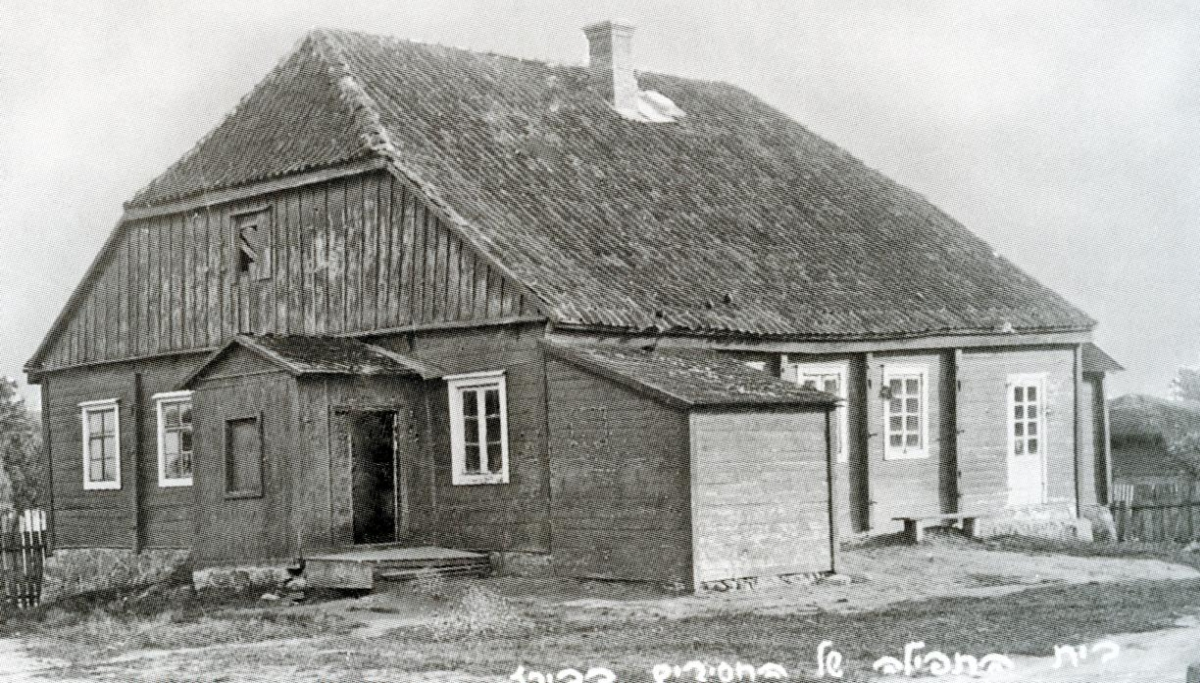
The Synagogue of Habad Hasidim in Birzai, the ’20s–’30s of the 20th century.

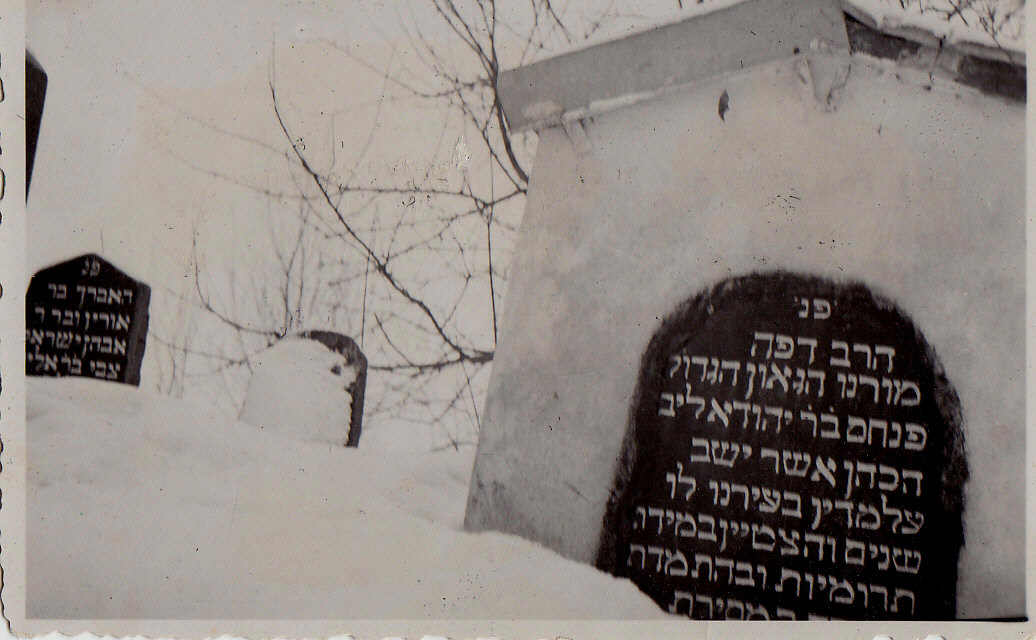
Lintup's tombstone in Biržai in 1936

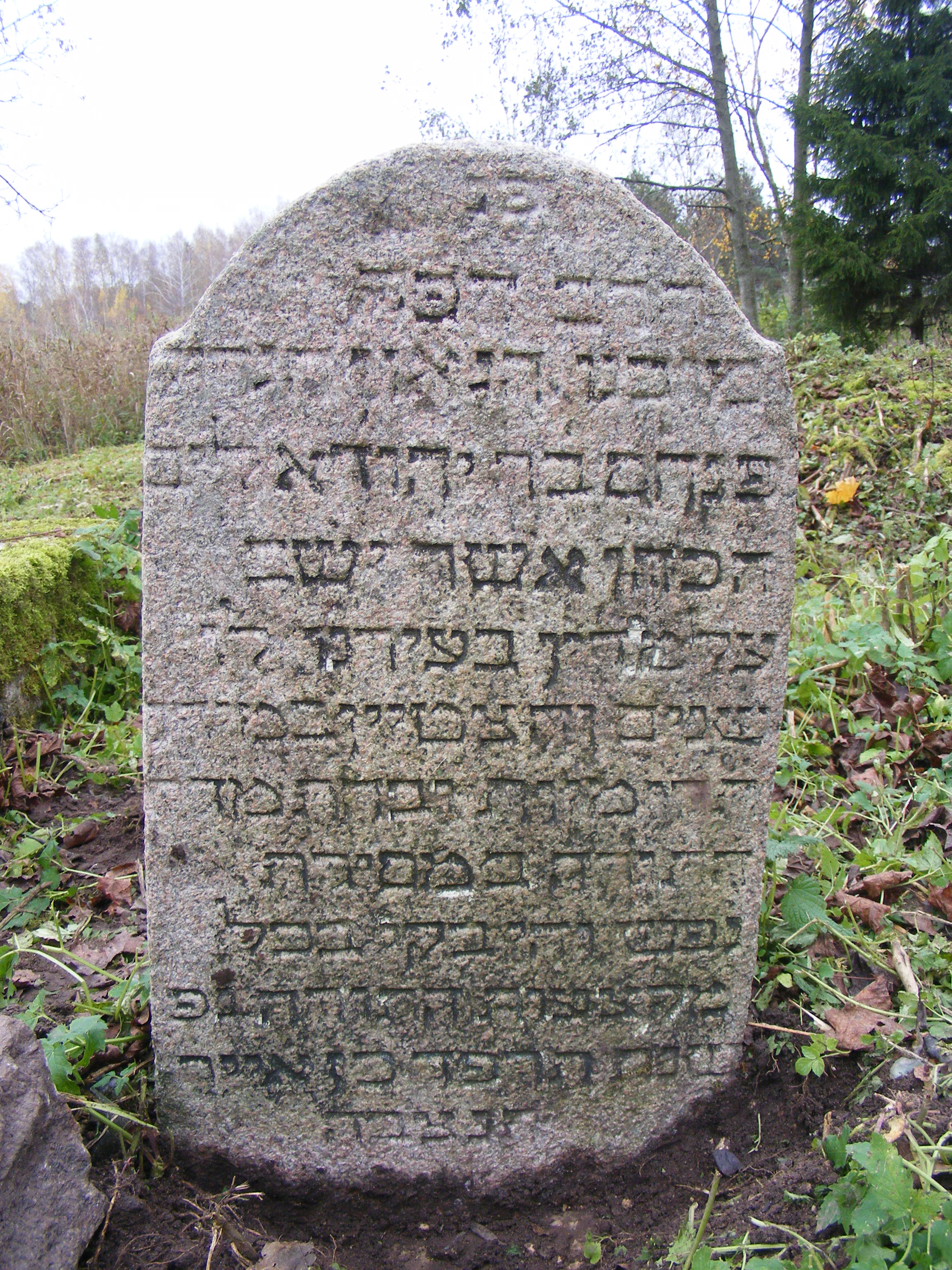
Lintup's uncovered tombstone in 2014.

Lintup was born in Dvinsk to Yehuda Leib HaKohen Lintup, a rabbi. In 1876, Pinchas was appointed rabbi in Vabolnik, Lithuania prior to being sought out by the Hasidic Jews of Biržai to lead their community in 1888. His student Menachem Mendel Frieden noted that Lintup was known as “one of the great rabbis of Lithuania . . . sharp and well versed in the entire treasury of Jewish law, he knew almost the entire Talmud by heart, he studied philosophy and progressive ideas, and he was pious and zealous.” Lintup was a Religious Zionist and supporter of the Mizrachi movement.

Lintup and his wife sought passage to Palestine in 1924. Rabbi Kook requested a visa for them from the British Governorate on 24 March 1924. This request was approved on 30 July 1924, However, Lintup had died two months prior.

Lintup died on 1 June 1924 in Biržai and was buried in the city's Jewish cemetery.

== Personal life ==
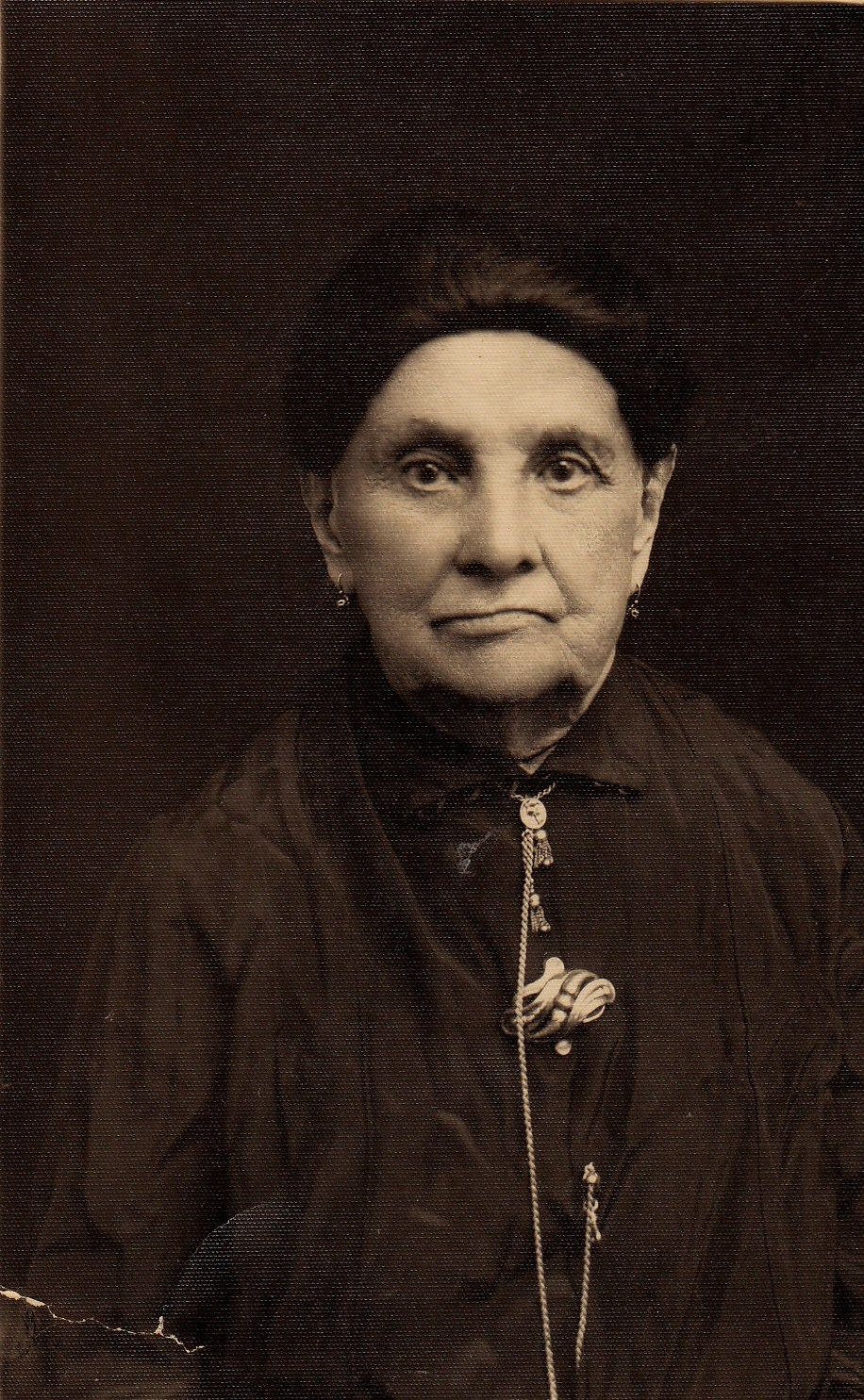
Lintup's wife Slova

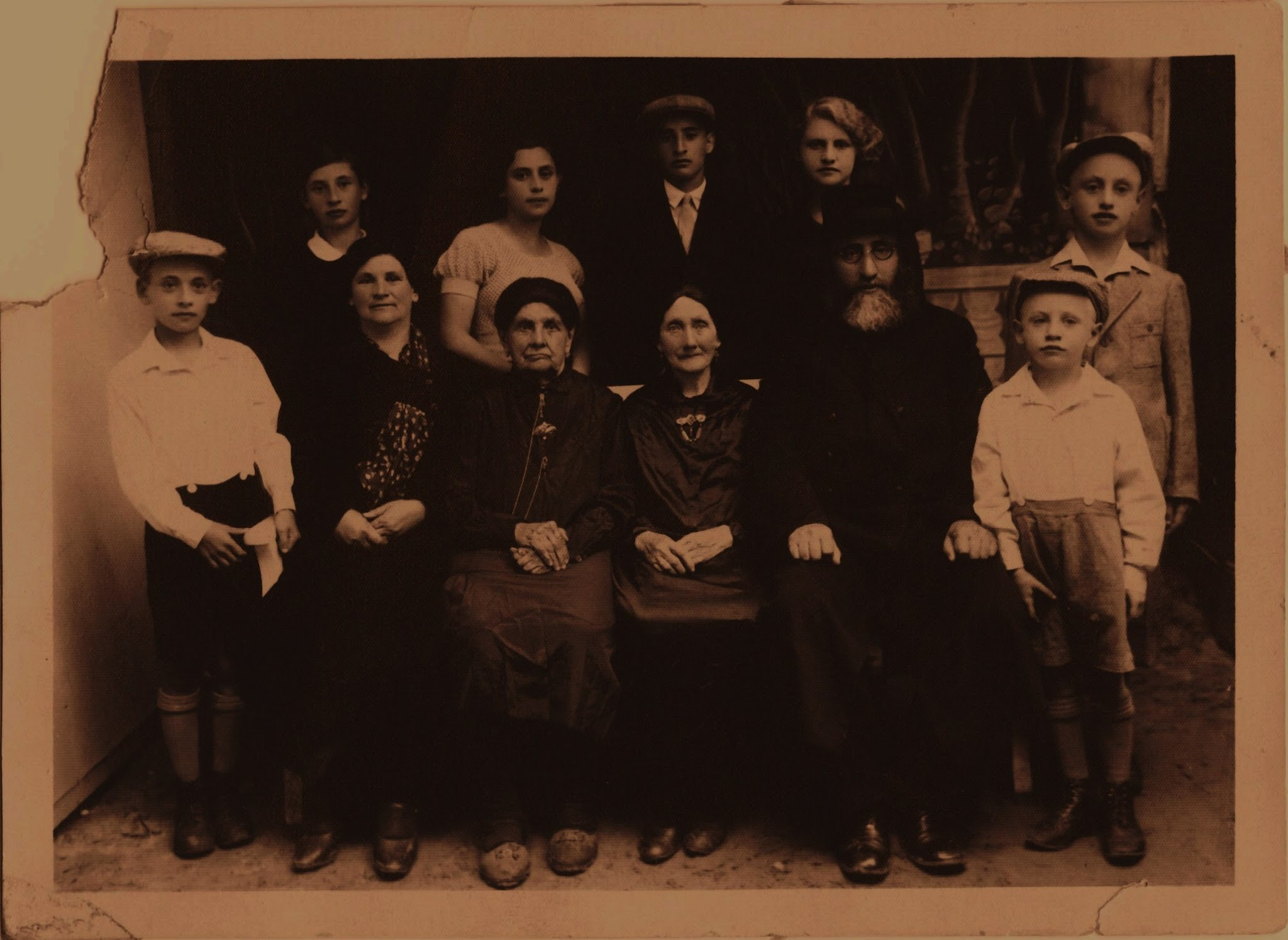
The Movsas family in Krekenava in 1938. Slova Lintup is seated third from left.

Lintup and his wife Slova (née Kantzapovich) had eleven children who survived childbirth. One of his sons, Tzvi Hirsch immigrated to the United States in 1905. He changed his name to Harry Sebee Linfield. He became a Reform rabbi.

Lintup's daughter Liba, married Binyomin Tzvi Movsas, who initially succeeded his father-in-law as rabbi in Birzai. Movsas later served as rabbi of the town of Krekenava until he was killed along with his family during the Holocaust. One of the Movsas’ children, Miriam, managed to escape, eventually settling in Cleveland, Ohio, where her husband, Eliezer Levi was rosh mechina (high school dean) at the Telshe Yeshiva.

== Philosophy ==
Lintup viewed the salvation of the Jewish people as inextricably linked to Torah study. He believed that knowledge of penimiyut haTorah (inwardness of Torah) contained the medicine for the spiritual malady of the generation. Both Lintup and Rabbi Abraham Isaac Kook attempted, each in his own way, to disseminate Kabbalah to the masses and came under criticism from their rabbinic peers for it.

Philosophically, Lintup sought to synthesize the schools of Moshe Chaim Luzzatto, the Vilna Gaon and Chabad. He believed that Kabbalah in general, and Tsimtsum in particular, were not to be taken in a purely literal fashion, thereby placing himself at odds with other Kabbalists. Frieden has stated that his teacher was a Mitnaged (opponent of Hasidism) in spirit, though he was Rabbi of the Hasidic community in Birzai.

Methodologically, Lintup was said to apply halakha leniently, which angered others. Yet when approached with complaints about Lintup's methods, the Rogatchover Gaon responded, "If I were not familiar with him personally, I would cut him off from the community, but I am acquainted with his honesty and his purity of heart and his great knowledge of Torah, and he has upon whom to rely if he is lenient in halakha. Let him be." He further believed in leniency with respect to the spiritual practice of non-Jews with respect to adherence to the Noahide laws. Scholar Dr. Marc B. Shapiro states that in Pitchai Shearim: “Lintop criticizes Maimonides’ view, Hilkhot Melakhim 8:10, that given the power Jews must force non-Jews to adopt the Noahide laws” as “this command only applied to the seven nations that inhabited ancient Canaan, but does not apply to any other non-Jew, even those living in the Land of Israel.” Furthermore, “. . . non-Jews who don’t observe the Noahide laws . . . [are] blameless as they don’t know any better, having been born into their cultures.”

Lintup also stressed the importance dissolving sectarian differences that divided the Jewish people in his day, especially the significant animosity between the Hasidim and the Mitnagdim. He believed that removing this hatred was a precondition to rebuilding the Holy Temple in the Land of Israel. In Yalkut Avenu Emunat Yisrael Lintup sought to bridge the divisions within the Jewish ranks between Sephardic and Ashkenazi Jews. A specific focus was the Rabbi's attempt to remove the divide between those who followed the Baal HaTanya (the first Rabbi of Chabad Lubavitch) and the Vilna Gaon (the leader of the non-Hassidic, Misnagdic Jews).

Relatedly, he sought to address the World Agudath Israel movement at its convention in Vienna in August 1923. Although the convention was noteworthy for the establishment of formal schooling for girls and the launching of Daf Yomi, the assembly proved to be a great disappointment, as it broke down into internecine separatist recriminations including attacks on his friend, Rabbi Kook.

Lintup also stressed in this work the central importance of faith in one's thinking. For although Lintup studied philosophy, he felt many would interpret philosophic thinking and the changes wrought by the industrial revolution as obviating the need for faith, which he believed central to the purposefulness and very existence of the Jewish people. Concerning faith, scholar Dr. Marc B. Shapiro notes that Lintup challenged “Maimonides’ view that one who is mistaken when it comes to principles of faith is worse than one who actually commits even the worst since,” as Lintup stated: “this view is very foreign to the spirit of the sages of the Talmud, who did not know philosophy” and “. . . people greater than Maimonides were mistaken when it came to the matter of G-d’s incorporeality.”

Finally, Lintup decried that his generation, unlike previous generations, did not see the divinity of their souls, their religious mission to study Torah, and the need to hold near their Jewish faith, but instead were concerned with blood and money and giving vent to their evil inclinations. In Hashvenu Shel Olim (The World's Account) Lintup sought to provide a remedy for what he perceived as a disease that led to Jewish despair and grief caused by Jews’ disassociation from their faith. An additional focus of Lintup's was to mitigate assimilation of Jews into European culture that moved the Jewish people away from upholding the teachings of the Torah and Jewish literature in the main. He stressed this in his work Ma’amar Binyan ha-Umah (Building of a Nation), yet he concurrently noted the benefit to what was offered to his people by the non-religious West, namely innovation that he believed would aid in the salvation of the Jewish people. Lintup offered that one day the ancient nation of the Israelites would be reconstituted through the use of modern technology to, amongst other ends, publish and disseminate Jewish writings that will ultimately uplift and unify the Jewish people. He believed the Jewish people were to become expert in modern Western technology while returning to following Jewish traditions. Lintup suggested that this would be analogous to the way in which the Japanese – a people he saw as small in numbers and geographically and culturally isolated from the West – modernized using Western technologically, yet retained their unique Eastern character in the course of developing their nation and defeating Russia in the Russo-Japanese War of 1905.

== Published works ==
In addition to authoring manuscripts, Lintup authored several books and extended essays, certain of which are available in the National Library of Israel, including:

- Pitchai Shearim (Opening of the Gates) that was published in Vilna in 1881. This was a work of Talmudic commentary.
- Yalkut Avenu Emunat Yisrael. Published in 1895.
- Ma’amar Binyan ha-Umah, (Building of a Nation) Published in 1906 & 1908.
- Hashvenu Shel Olim (The World's Account), Published in 1912. I

In the 21st century, works containing certain of Rabbi Lintup's letters and theological views were published, including:

- Kana’uteh de-Pinhas (The Zeal of Pinhas) produced by Rabbi Bezalel Naor, centers on a previously unpublished 1909 letter from Rabbi Lintup to Rabbi Abraham Isaac Hakohen Kook, the first Ashkenazi Chief Rabbi of Eretz Yisrael.
- Snos Dor va-Dor (Volume 4) produced by Reuven Dessler contains two significant letters from Rabbi Lintup to Rabbi Kook circa 1907 and 1909.
