= Armoured car regiment =

Reconnaissance units of the British Army

Armoured Car Regiments were reconnaissance units employed by the British Army during the 20th century. The primary equipment of these units was the armoured car with many different types of armoured cars serving in the regiments during the Second World War and the Cold War. An armoured car regiment typically numbered several hundred men and several tens of armoured cars. By the end of the 20th century, armoured cars as front-line reconnaissance vehicles had been supplanted by tracked vehicles in the British Army and the surviving regiments converted to other organisational forms.

== Regimental organisation in the Second World War ==
Armoured car regiments were a component of the Royal Armoured Corps. Similarly equipped units of the Reconnaissance Corps were organic parts of infantry divisions during the Second World War.

=== France 1940 ===
In the 1940 campaign in France and Flanders, the 12th Royal Lancers was the sole armoured car regiment fielded by the British Expeditionary Force. During the 1940 campaign, the 12th Lancers had an authorized strength of 38 armoured cars and about 380 men organised into a headquarters and three squadrons. This regiment served as the army-level reconnaissance asset of the B. E. F.

=== The war in the desert ===
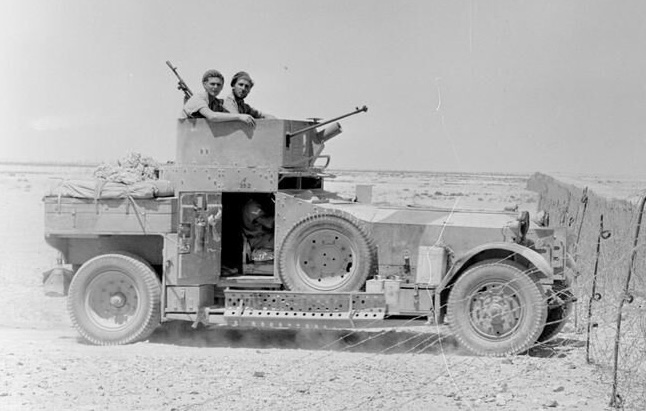
Rolls-Royce armoured car in 1940

In the open spaces of North Africa, armoured reconnaissance was extensively used by both the Axis and the British and Commonwealth) forces. Changes in doctrine made the armoured car regiment an organic asset of the armoured divisions, in which role the regiments typically fielded between 50 and 60 armoured cars ranging in type from older Rolls-Royce armoured cars to more modern Humber types. Less heavily armed scout cars such as the Humber scout car were used as well. During the East African Campaign, the 1st East African, Kenya, and Southern Rhodesian armoured car regiments were employed by the East Africa Command.

=== Italy and northwestern Europe 1943-45 ===
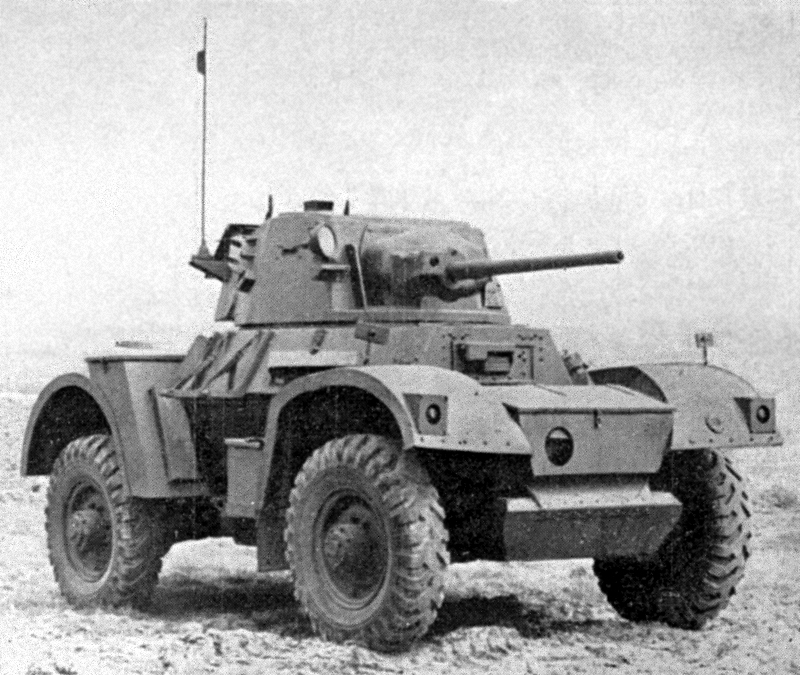
Daimler armoured car

In 1943, the armoured car regiments were removed from the armoured divisions and used as corps-level reconnaissance assets with one regiment assigned per corps. In this role, they achieved their final organisation of a headquarters and four squadrons with 767 men. Each squadron had five troops of two Dingo scout cars and two Daimler armoured cars. The heaviest armoured cars in the regiments, the AEC armoured cars, now mounted 75-mm cannon, a far cry from the original armoured car armament of one machine gun and one antitank rifle of 1940.

=== Commonwealth and other forces ===
Besides the British Army, Canada, Poland, Southern Rhodesia, and the Union of South Africa also fielded armoured car regiments organised along British lines and employed against Axis troops in North Africa, Italy, and northwestern Europe. Australian forces fielded the 2/11 Armoured Car Regiment, but it was not employed in combat.

== Postwar ==
For decades after the Second World War, the British Army of the Rhine and forces in the U.K. maintained armoured car regiments whose mission remained tactical armoured reconnaissance on conventional battlefields. The 4th Queen's Own Hussars saw combat in the Malayan Emergency from 1948-51 as an armoured car regiment. Other armoured car regiments such as the Royal Horse Guards were deployed to United Nations Peacekeeping Force in Cyprus as a result of the unrest and military events there.

The last armoured car intended for conventional battlefield use, the Fox armoured reconnaissance vehicle, was withdrawn from active British service in 1994 and replaced by tracked reconnaissance vehicles like the Sabre. Although reconnaissance regiments like the Household Cavalry Regiment remain active in the British Army, they no longer operate armoured cars and hence the British forces no longer field armoured car regiments.

== Organization (World War II) ==
Regimental HQ

- HQ Squadron
  - 1× Daimler Scout Car
  - 1× Daimler Armoured Car
  - 3× Staghound Armoured Cars
  - AA Troop – 4× Staghound or Humber AA
  - Inter-communication Troop – 12× Humber Scout Cars
  - Administrative Troop
  - Signal Platoon
  - Light Aid Detachment

Four squadrons (Note: Also called Sabre squadrons.)

- Squadron HQ
  - 1× Daimler Scout Car
  - 1× Daimler Armoured Car
  - 4× Staghound Armoured Cars
- Heavy Troop
  - 1× Daimler Scout Car
  - 2× M3 Gun Motor Carriage (Note: Generally used as a regimental battery.) (Note: Later replaced with AEC Armoured Cars or Staghound Armoured Cars.)
- Support Troop
  - 1× Daimler Scout Car
  - 3× White Scout Car
- Five Reconnaissance Troops
  - 2× Daimler Scout Car
  - 2× Daimler Armoured Car

== Vehicles ==
=== Armoured cars ===
- Humber Armoured Car
- Daimler Armoured Car
- Staghound Armoured Car
  - Staghound Mk.III

=== Other vehicles ===
- Humber Light Reconnaissance Car
- M3 Gun Motor Carriage
