= Phineas Bowles (British Army officer, born 1690) =

Lieutenant-General Phineas Bowles (24 January 1690 – 22 October 1749) of Beaulieu, Dublin, was a British Army officer and politician who sat in the House of Commons from 1735 to 1741.

Bowles was a younger son of Phineas Bowles of St. Michael's, Crooked Lane, London, and Loughborough House, Lambeth, and his wife Margaret Dockwra, daughter of William Dockwra, merchant of London. He joined the army and was a Captain in the Inniskilling Fusiliers in 1710, taking part in the campaigns of 1710 to 1711 under the Duke of Marlborough. He became captain and lieutenant-colonel of the 3rd Foot Guards in 1713. In 1719 he succeeded his cousin, Major-General Phineas Bowles, as colonel of the 12th Lancers in Ireland and commanded the regiment in Ireland until 1740. He married Alethea Maria Hill, daughter and heiress of Samuel Hill of Kilmainham, Dublin under a settlement dated 7 and 8 June 1724. He became a brigadier-general in 1735.

Bowles was returned unopposed as Member of Parliament (MP) for Bewdley at a by-election on 20 February 1735 to replace his elder brother William, who chose to sit for Bridport. He voted with the Administration and was promoted to major-general in 1739 and appointed Governor of Limerick. He became colonel of the 6th Dragoon Guards in 1740 and served with them for the rest of his life. He did not stand at the 1741 British general election when his brother took up the seat at Bewdley again.

Bowles was promoted to lieutenant-general on 27 May 1745 and was appointed Governor of Londonderry. He died in Dublin on 22 October 1749, leaving two sons and a daughter. He left a fortune of over £200,000.

== Sources ==
- "Bowles, Phineas" . Dictionary of National Biography. London: Smith, Elder & Co. 1885–1900.

Parliament of the United Kingdom
Preceded by William Bowles	Member of Parliament for Bewdley; 1735–1741	Succeeded by William Bowles
Military offices
Preceded by Phineas Bowles	Colonel of Bowles's Regiment of Dragoons; 1719–1740	Succeeded by Alexander Rose
Preceded by Thomas Pearce	Governor of Londonderry; 1739–1749	Succeeded by Henry Cornewall
Preceded by The Lord Cathcart	Colonel of His Majesty's 1st Regiment of Carabiniers; 1740–1749	Succeeded by Hon. James Cholmondeley
