= Phinehas (disambiguation) =

Phinehas was son of Eleazar and grandson of Aaron the High Priest.

Phinehas, Pinhas, or Pinchas may also refer to:

- Phinehas, son of Eli, a priest at Shiloh who died with his brother Hophni when the Philistines captured the Ark of the Covenant
- Pinechas (parsha), the 41st weekly Torah portion
- Phineas Priesthood, a Christian Identity movement
- Phinehas (band), a band from La Mirada, California
- Phinehas (EP), an EP by the band of the same name

== See also ==
- Phineas
- Pinchas (given name)
