= Phineas Bowles (British Army officer, died 1722) =

English army major-general

Phineas Bowles (died 1722) was an English army major-general.

== Life ==
The subject's father was Valentine, his uncle was Colonel John Seymour, Governor of Maryland, and a brother named Tobias, a London merchant, was nominated to succeed his uncle as Royal Governor of Maryland. Bowles served in the Admiralty as a secretary from 6 March 1689 until 15 January 1690. Bowles is first mentioned in the Military Entry Books in January 1692, when he was appointed captain-lieutenant in the regiment of Colonel W. Selwyn, later the 2nd Queen's, then just arrived in Holland from Ireland. In July 1705 he succeeded Colonel Caulfield in command of a regiment of foot in Ireland, with which he went to Spain and served at the Siege of Barcelona.

According to the memoranda of General Erie, Bowles was one of the regiments broken at the bloody battle of Almanza. It appears to have been reorganised in England, as Narcissus Luttrell mentions Bowles's arrival in England on parole, and afterward that he was at Portsmouth with his regiment, awaiting embarkation with some troops supposed to be destined for Newfoundland. Instead, he again went with his Regiment to Spain, where it was distinguished at the battle of Saragossa in 1710, and was one of the regiments surrounded by the mountains of Castile, and made prisoners, in December of the same year.

After this Bowles's regiment disappeared from the rolls, and its colonel remained unemployed until 1715, when, as a brigadier-general, he was commissioned to raise a corps of dragoons, of six troops, in Berkshire, Hampshire, and Buckinghamshire, to rendezvous at Reading. This corps became the 12th Royal Lancers. In 1719 Bowles was transferred to the colonelcy of a Regiment of Dragoons. Brigadier General Bowles was replaced in 1721 at Dublin Castle by Philip Honywood, Esq.

He died in 1722. His cousin's son Phineas Bowles (1690–1749) was a lieutenant-general.

== Sources ==
- Luttrell's Relation of State Affairs, 1857, vi. 213, 427
- Home Office Mil. Entry Books, vols. iii. and viii.
- Treasury Papers, cvi. 57, cxvi. 32
- Cannon's Hist. Records, 6th Dragoon Guards, 8th Hussars, 12th Lancers.

Military offices
New regiment	Colonel of Bowles's Regiment of Dragoons; 1715–1719	Succeeded by Phineas Bowles
Preceded by John Pepper	Colonel of Bowles's Regiment of Dragoons; 1719–1722	Succeeded by Richard Munden
