= Queen's Royal Hussars =

Most senior armoured regiment in the British Army

The Queen's Royal Hussars (The Queen's Own and Royal Irish)
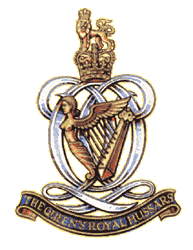
- Cap Badge of The Queen's Royal Hussars
- Active: 2 September 1993 – Present
- Allegiance: United Kingdom
- Branch: British Army
- Type: Line cavalry
- Role: Tank warfare
- Size: One regiment
- Part of: Royal Armoured Corps
- Garrison/HQ: RHQ – Regent's Park Barracks; Regiment – Assaye Barracks, Tidworth
- Mottos: Mente et Manu, translated as "mind and main"
- March: Quick - Regimental Quick March of The Queen's Royal Hussars; Slow - 3rd Hussars Slow March/ Litany of Loretto/The Garb of Old Gaul/March of the Scottish Archers
- Mascot: Drum Horse (Alamein)

Commanders
- Colonel-in-Chief: Prince Edward, Duke of Edinburgh

Insignia
- Tactical Recognition Flash
- Arm Badge: Maid of Warsaw from 7th Hussars
- Tartan: Saffron (Pipers' kilts)
- Abbreviation: QRH

The Queen's Royal Hussars (The Queen's Own and Royal Irish) (QRH) is the most senior armoured regiment in the British Army, equipped with Challenger 2 main battle tanks. The regiment was formed on 1 September 1993 from the amalgamation of the Queen's Own Hussars and the Queen's Royal Irish Hussars. The regiment and its antecedents have been awarded 172 Battle Honours and eight Victoria Crosses. The regiment was based in Sennelager, Germany, until 2019 when it was relocated to Tidworth Camp, England. The Queen's Royal Hussars serves as the armoured regiment for the 20th Armoured Brigade Combat Team.

== History ==
The Queen's Royal Hussars was formed in Fallingbostel on 1 September 1993 from the amalgamation of the Queen's Own Hussars and the Queen's Royal Irish Hussars. Home Headquarters was formed shortly thereafter at Regent's Park Barracks in London where it remains today. After the amalgamation, the regiment became the cavalry of the following areas: Northern Ireland, Warwickshire, Worcestershire, West Midlands, Surrey, and Sussex. For a short time the regiment maintained a regimental band formed by the amalgamation of the two former regiment's bands, designated as the Band of the Queen's Royal Hussars. However, following a reorganisation of the Army Music, the band was amalgamated with the Bands of the King's Royal Hussars and Light Dragoons to form the Band of the Hussars and Light Dragoons on 1 September 1994, part of the new Corps of Army Music.

The Queen's Own Hussars, normally referred to by the abbreviation QOH, was a cavalry regiment of the British Army, formed from the amalgamation of 3rd The King's Own Hussars and the 7th Queen's Own Hussars at Candahar Barracks, Tidworth in 1958.

The Queen's Royal Irish Hussars, abbreviated as QRIH, was a cavalry regiment of the British Army formed from the amalgamation of the 4th Queen's Own Hussars and the 8th King's Royal Irish Hussars in Hohne, West Germany in 1958.

The regiment, in January 1996, became the first to be deployed in Challenger 1 tanks to Bosnia with NATO's British-led Implementation Force IFOR. The regiment received the Canadian Forces' Unit Commendation for its actions in Bosnia on 15 June 1996.

In August 1997 the regiment deployed to Northern Ireland on Operation Banner and on their return moved in March 1998 to Athlone Barracks at Sennelager as armoured regiment for 20th Armoured Brigade. In 1999 the regiment converted to Challenger 2 tanks in which B Squadron deployed to Kosovo with 1PWRR Battle Group in August 2000. The regiment deployed to Kosovo in the dismounted role the following year from October 2001 to April 2002.

December 2003 saw the regiment deploy once again, this time to Iraq on Operation Telic 3. The regiment saw its first Military Cross awarded to Lance Corporal Christopher Balmforth of B Squadron for his actions during an ambush in Basra.

April 2006 saw the regiment deploy once again to Iraq on Operation Telic 8 and December 2008 saw the regiment deployed to Iraq on Operation Telic 13. As the final Operation Telic The Queen's Royal Hussars were intimately involved in the drawdown from the main British base and spent many hours escorting convoys to and from Kuwait. In 2011 the regiment deployed on Operation Herrick 15 as a ground holding Battle Group to Afghanistan in the infantry role: they worked with the Afghan National Police handing over control of checkpoints.

On return from Afghanistan in 2012 the regiment was called on to support the security for the London Olympic Games. The remainder of the year was used to return to the armoured role. 2013 saw C Squadron training with 5 Rifles on Exercise Bavarian Charger, mounted on Challenger 2. The Queen's Royal Hussars Battlegroup, comprising sub-units from 5 Rifles and 1 PWRR deployed on Exercise Prairie Thunder 2 between July and August 2013.

In June 2014, the regiment deployed C Squadron to Operation Herrick 20 in Afghanistan, as the Warthog Group. This role involved crewing Warthog armoured tracked vehicles and operating with dismounted infantry from 5 RIFLES to disrupt insurgents in Helmand during the draw down of British troops from Camp Bastion. They were the last British combat units on the ground in Helmand.

The regiment moved to Tidworth from Germany with 20 Armoured Infantry Brigade, forming the senior of three heavy armoured regiments of British Army's Reactive Force, in 2019. It was the last British tank regiment to leave Germany.

The Queen's Royal Hussars (QRH) took lead of NATO's enhanced Forward Presence (eFP) Battlegroup Estonia in March 2023.

In January 2025 they became one of the first regiments to be outfitted with the new Ajax armoured fighting vehicle.

== Organisation ==
The regiment comes under the direct command of 20th Armoured Brigade Combat Team, itself part of the 3rd (UK) Division, the British Army's only armoured division.

The regiment comprises five squadrons:

- HQ Squadron
- A Squadron (The Devil's Children) – Challenger 2
- B (Balaklava) Squadron – Command and reconnaissance squadron since October 2020, previously operated Challenger 2
- C Squadron (Fighting C) – Challenger 2
- D Squadron (The Black Pig) – Challenger 2

=== Tanks ===
The Queen's Royal Hussars is equipped with the Challenger 2, a third-generation main battle tank that has been in service since 1998. As part of the Future Soldier reforms, the regiment's reconnaissance troop will be equipped with Ajax armoured fighting vehicles.

==== Challenger 3 ====
From 2027, the Challenger 2 will be replaced by the new fourth-generation Challenger 3, which has a 120mm L55A1 smoothbore gun, providing commonality with the Leopard 2, M1 Abrams and other NATO tanks (unlike Challenger 2's L30A1 rifled bore). The L55A1 has a longer barrel and the ability to handle higher chamber pressures. The L55A1 allows Challenger 3 use of programmable high-explosive ammunition such as the DM11, enabling airburst capability. Under the Heavy Armour Automotive Improvement Programme, Challenger 3 will receive an improved version of Challenger 2’s CV12-6A engine – CV12-8A – along with third-generation hydrogas suspension. The tank's survivability will also be increased, with the addition of the Elbit Laser Warning System (ELAWS); capable of "detecting, categorising and accurately pinpointing laser sources such as range finders, Anti-Tank Guided Missiles, target designators and infrared illuminators." The Challenger 3 will further be equipped with the Trophy active protection system from Rafael Advanced Defense Systems, which provides 360° azimuth protection from threats including "rockets to ATGMs and High-Explosive Anti-Tank (HEAT) rounds".

== Victoria Cross ==
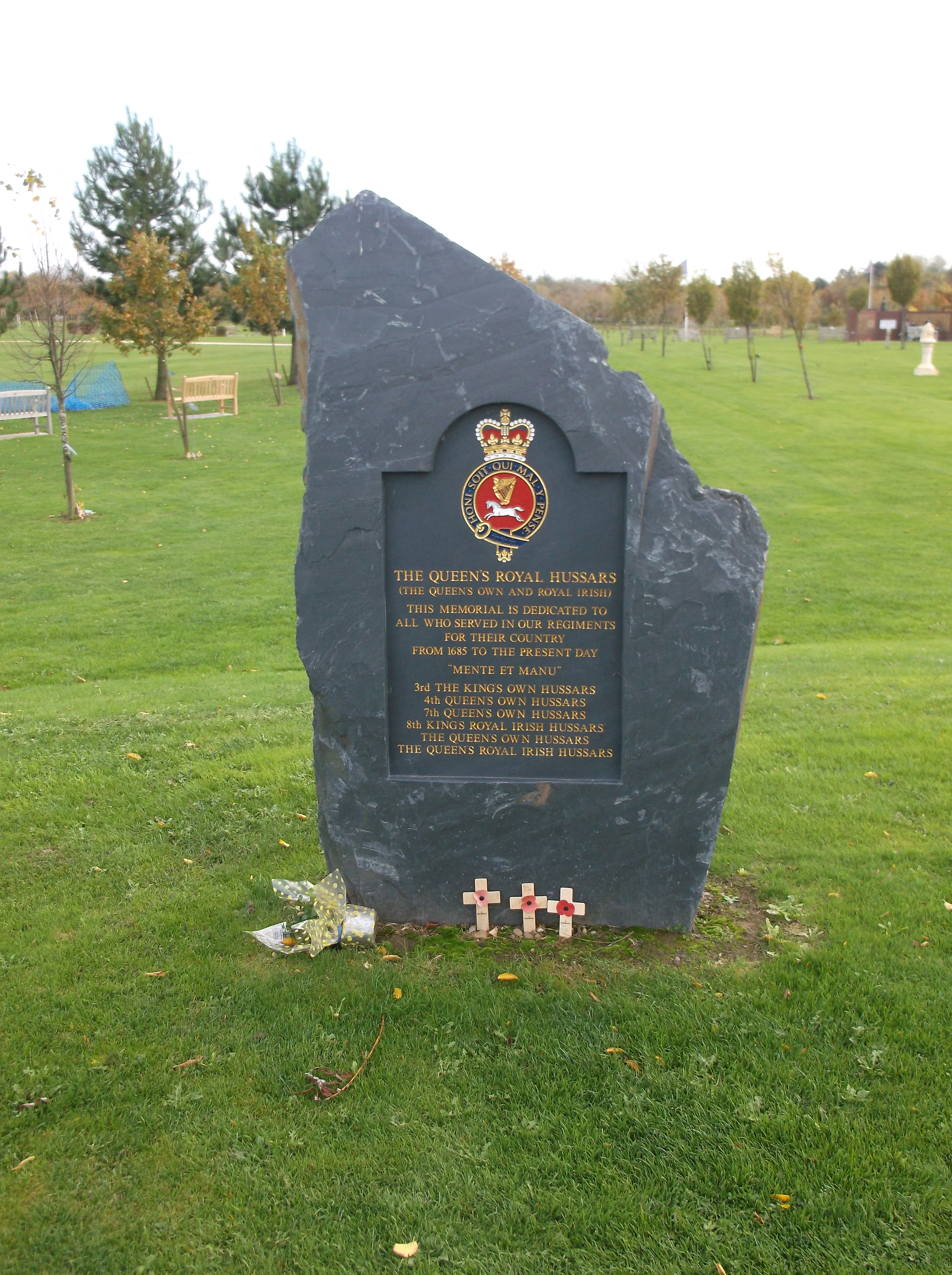
Queen's Royal Hussars memorial, National Memorial Arboretum, Staffordshire

Holders of the Victoria Cross included:

- James Champion (8th King's Royal Irish Hussars)
- Samuel Parkes (4th Queen's Own Light Dragoons)
- Clement Walker Heneage (8th King's Royal Irish Hussars)
- George Hollis (8th King's Royal Irish Hussars)
- John Pearson (8th King's Royal Irish Hussars)
- Joseph Ward (8th King's Royal Irish Hussars)
- Cornet William Bankes (7th Queen's Own Hussars)
- Major Charles Fraser (7th Queen's Own Hussars)

== Colonels-in-Chief ==
- 1993–2002: Queen Elizabeth The Queen Mother LG LT CI ONZ GCVO GBE CC RRC CD
- 2002–2021: Field Marshal Prince Philip, Duke of Edinburgh KG KT OM ONZ AK GCVO GBE QSO GCL CC CMM CD PC ADC
- 2023–present: Prince Edward, Duke of Edinburgh KG KT GCVO CD ADC

== Deputy Colonel-in-Chief ==
- 1993–2002: Field Marshal HRH Prince Philip, Duke of Edinburgh KG KT OM GBE AC QSO CD PC ADC

== Regimental Colonels ==
Colonels of the regiment have been:

- 1993–1999: Maj-Gen. Richard Edward Barron CB
- 1999–2004: Maj-Gen. David John Malcolm Jenkins CBE
- 2004–2009: Maj-Gen. Arthur Denaro CBE
- 2009–2014: Brig Andrew Bellamy
- 2014–2023: Lt-Gen Sir Tom Beckett KCB CBE
- 2023–present: Maj-Gen. Nicholas D.G. Cowley OBE

== Commanding Officers ==
Regimental Commanding Officers included:

- 1993–1994: Lieutenant Colonel Andrew N. Bellamy
- 1994–1996: Lt Col Nigel Q. W. Beer
- 1996–1998: Lt Col Nicholas G. Smith
- 1998–2000: Lt Col Christopher H. Vernon
- 2000–2002: Lt Col David J. L. Swann
- 2002–2004: Lt Col Andrew C. Cuthbert
- 2004–2007: Lt Col David H. Labouchere
- 2007–2009: Lt Col Christopher M. B. Coles
- 2009–2012: Lt Col Ian S. Mortimer
- 2012–2014: Lt Col James R. Howard
- 2014–2017: Lt Col Alexander J. H. Porter
- 2017–2019: Lt Col Nicholas D. G. Cowley
- 2019–2022: Lt Col James T. Shann
- 2022–2024: Lt Col Stephen Wilson
- 2024-Present: Lt Col Gerald Kearse

== Museums ==
The Museum of The Queen's Royal Hussars is located at Trinity Mews, Priory Road, Warwick CV34 4NA.

The museum opened in 2022 and replaced the two previous museums:

- The Queen's Own Hussars Museum was located at Lord Leycester Hospital in Warwick until it closed.
- The Queen's Royal Irish Hussars Museum was located at The Redoubt Fortress in Eastbourne until it closed.

== The Regimental Crest & Cap Badge ==
The crest and cap badge are as follows:

- The Regimental Crest is made up from the Angel Harp of the 8th Hussars and the Queen's Royal Irish Hussars, which is placed above the White Horse of Hanover of the 3rd Hussars and The Queen's Own Hussars. These are encircled by the Garter Belt, above which is placed the Queen's Crown.
- The Regimental Cap Badge is made up from the Angel Harp of the 8th Hussars and the Queen's Royal Irish Hussars, superimposed on the Regimental cypher of The Queen's Own Hussars, originally bestowed on the 7th Hussars in 1727; the whole is surmounted by the Queen's crown and a lion, with a scroll underneath giving the Regiment's title in blue and gold.

== Privileges & traditions ==
The regiment has gained a number of unique privileges and traditions:

Loyal Toast: Officers dining in the Regimental Officers’ Mess have the privilege of not drinking the loyal toast and ignoring the National Anthem when it is played at dinner. This originates from the Jacobite Rebellion in 1745 when all Army officers were required to drink to the health of the Sovereign in their messes after dinner as a token of loyalty. The King, however, absolved the Regiment (3H) from this, saying their loyalty was always beyond question. This privilege was re-affirmed by the Sovereign prior to amalgamation.

Badges and Symbols

The White Horse of Hanover: Ranking second, after the Crown, among the regiment's military badges, it was bestowed by the first three Georges to certain regiments for their part in suppressing the Jacobites. It was first granted, as a special head-dress badge, by King George I to The 3rd The King's Own Regiment of Dragoons in 1715 for their part in defeating James Francis Edward Stuart (The Old Pretender).

Crossbelts: At the Battle of Almenar in 1710 the 8th Dragoons pursued the Spanish Cavalry Corps and, equipping themselves with the crossbelts of the enemy, cut down the Spaniards with their own swords. The crossbelts were worn with distinction for many years, and the nickname 'St Georges Crossbelts' was given to the regiment. Although the crossbelt worn today is based on the original 4th Hussar pattern, the continuing tradition of titling the regimental journal The Crossbelts is in recognition of this famous action.

The Maid of Warsaw

The Maid of Warsaw: Every member of the regiment wears the Maid of Warsaw, the coat of arms of the City of Warsaw, on the left sleeve of his No. 2 (Service) Dress. This honour was awarded to the 7th Hussars by the Commander of the Second Polish Corps in recognition of their valour in support of the Polish forces during the Italian campaign in World War II. Traditionally the original crest presented to the regiment is placed in front of the commanding officer on Dinner Nights.

The Fern Leaf: All vehicles in the regiment display the emblem of New Zealand, the fern leaf, to commemorate the association of The 3rd Hussars with the 2nd New Zealand Division at the Battle of El Alamein where the regiment lost all but five tanks breaching the German line. This honour was granted by General Lord Freyberg VC.

Kettle Drums: By command of King George II the silver kettle drums captured by The King's Own Regiment of Dragoons, later The 3rd Hussars, at Dettingen are borne by a drum horse ridden by a sergeant kettledrummer - both being additional to the regimental establishment. The drums are always carried at the head of the regiment on ceremonial parades and are, uniquely amongst cavalry regiments, never covered by drum banners, the battle honours being engraved directly onto the sides of the drums. In 1772 when Lord Southampton commanded the regiment, his wife gave a silver collar to be worn by the kettledrummer, which is still worn today when parading in full dress with the drums. The present drum horse is named Alamein and its nickname is Dudley.

Other traditions

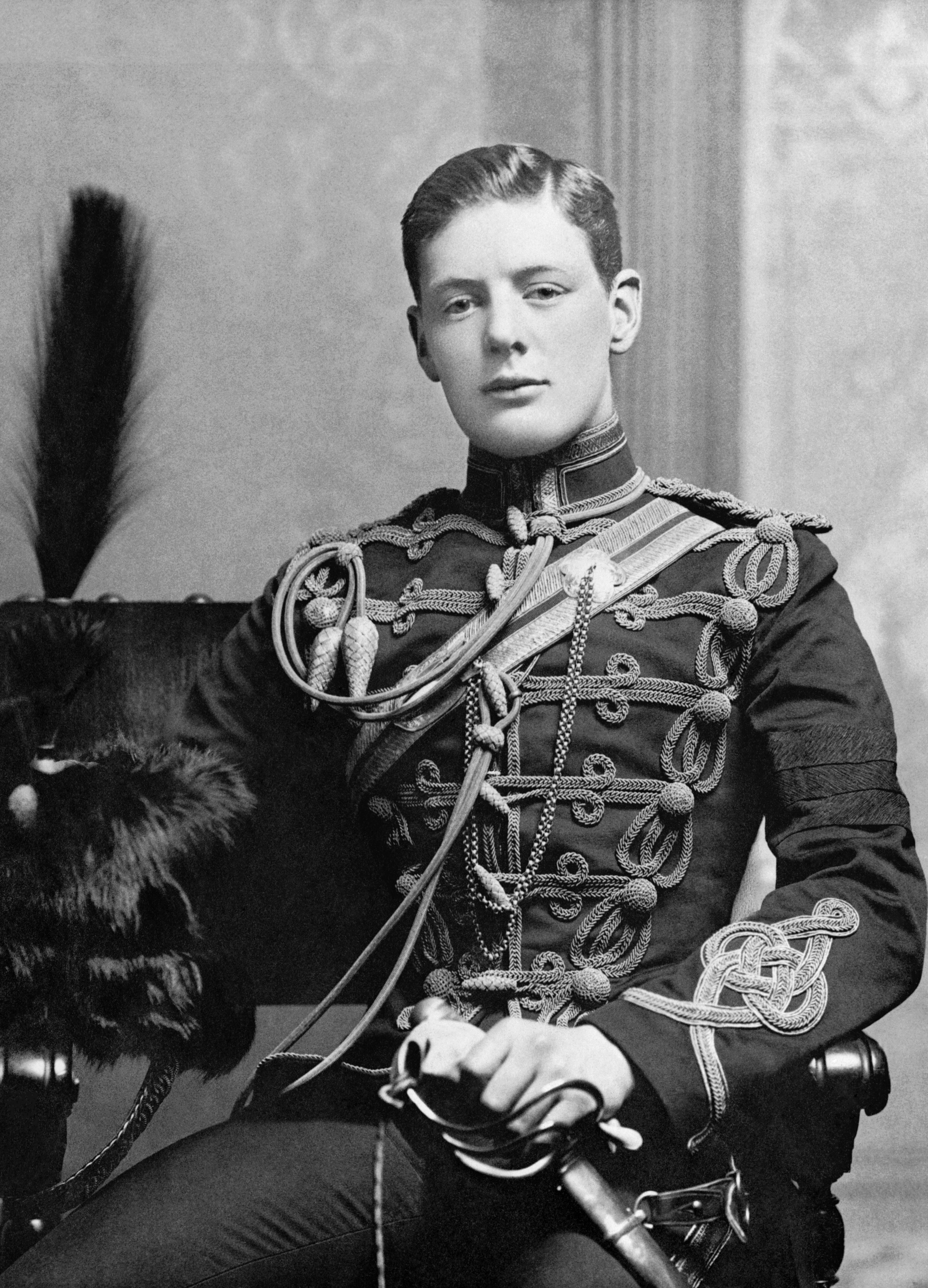
Winston Churchill 1895

Winston Churchill: Winston Churchill, who has been described as 'the greatest Hussar of them all', was commissioned into the 4th Hussars in 1895, and later became the colonel of the regiment from 1941, until the 4th Queen's Own Hussars was amalgamated with the 8th Hussars in 1958, after which he became colonel of the new regiment, Queen's Royal Irish Hussars, remaining so until his death in 1965. In recognition of this, the Churchill Cup is awarded to the top-scoring troop in the regiment's annual gunnery competition. The commanding officer's tank is also named 'Churchill'.

Regimental Colours

The colours are as follows:

- Garter Blue: The primary colour of the regiment is garter blue. This dates from when the Queen Consort's Regiment of Dragoons, later the 3rd Hussars, wore the queen's livery with garter blue feathered hats. It has been in continuous use ever since.
- Green: The use of green dates from 1748 when it was the facing colour of Princess Anne of Denmark's Regiment of Dragoons, later the 4th Hussars. It has an association with Ireland, which remains a recruiting area for the regiment. Officers and senior ranks wear green jumpers and all ranks wear green berets. Officers can be distinguished by their distinctive tent hats (the only item of army headdress worn without a cap badge other than with combat uniforms).
- Yellow: The traditional Light Cavalry colour is yellow, which has been used by all of the regiment's predecessors.

Regimental song

The lyrics of the song are:
I'm a soldier in the King's Army.
I'm a galloping Queen's Hussar.
I've sailed the ocean wide and blue.
I'm a chap who knows a thing or two.
Been in many a tight corner.
Shown the enemy who we are.
I can ride a horse.
Go on a spree, or sing a comic song.
And that denotes a Queen's Hussar.

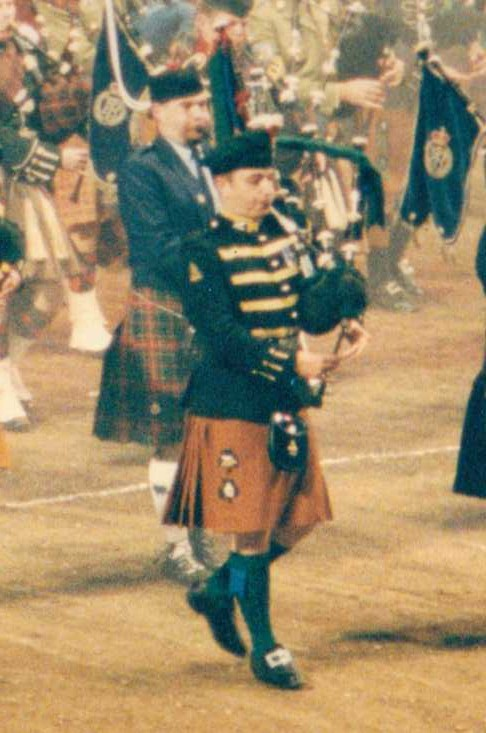
Tpr Paul J Ashfield, 1999 Royal Tournament

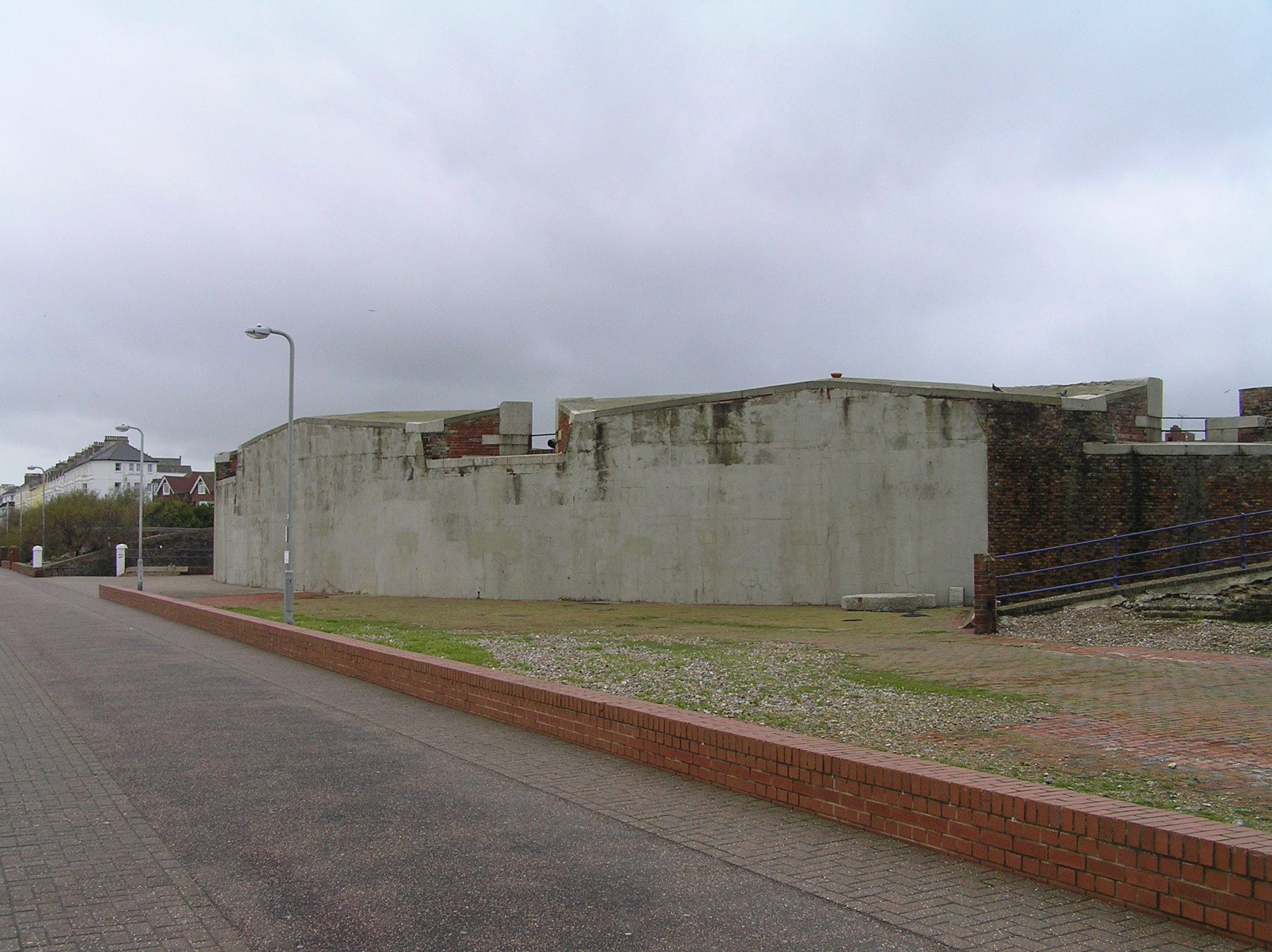
The Eastbourne Redoubt South Seaward facade

=== The Regimental Pipes and Drums ===
The Pipes and Drums were inherited from the Queen's Royal Irish Hussars. There has been no formal adoption of pipe music by the regiment, but the pipe tunes have become very much a part of regimental parades, the following tunes have become part of the regiment's music.

- Killaloe Composed by Robert Martin in 1887 as part of the show "Miss Esmeralda".
- The Minstrel Boy The original words were composed by Thomas Moore, set to an old traditional Irish air originally named "The Moreen".
- Highland Cathedral A modern slow melody composed by M. Korb for bagpipes, it is a haunting tune used as a slow march.
- St Patrick's Day Played by the Irish Pipes at the battle of Fontenoy in 1745, though it has long been a popular patriotic Irish song.

=== Regimental days ===
The following are celebrated as battle honour days:

- Dettingen 27 June
- Balaclava 25 October
- El Alamein 2 November

St Patrick's Day is also celebrated.

== Lineage ==
1881 Childers Reforms	1957 Defence White Paper	1990 Options for Change - today
3rd (The King's Own) Hussars	The Queen's Own Hussars	The Queen's Royal Hussars
7th (Queen's Own) Hussars	The Queen's Own Hussars	The Queen's Royal Hussars
4th (Queen's Own) Hussars	Queen's Royal Irish Hussars	The Queen's Royal Hussars
8th (The King's Royal Irish) Hussars	Queen's Royal Irish Hussars	The Queen's Royal Hussars

== Alliances ==
Commonwealth

- Canada – The Sherbrooke Hussars
- Canada – Royal Canadian Hussars
- Canada – 8th Canadian Hussars (Princess Louise's)
- Australia – 2nd/14th Light Horse Regiment (Queensland Mounted Infantry)
- Australia – 3rd/9th Light Horse (South Australian Mounted Rifles)
- Australia – 4th/19th Prince of Wales Light Horse Regiment
- Australia – 3rd Battalion, Royal Australian Regiment
- New Zealand – Queen Alexandra's Mounted Rifles
- South Africa – Queen Nandi Mounted Rifles
- South Africa – Umvoti Mounted Rifles
- South Africa – Johannesburg Light Horse Regiment

Non-Commonwealth

- Belgium – 2/4 Regiment Lansiers
- France – 7eme Regiment de Chasseurs
- Germany – ArmdBn 203 (Bonds of Friendship)

=== Affiliated Yeomanry ===
- The Royal Wessex Yeomanry
- The North Irish Horse

== Order of precedence ==
Preceded by Royal Dragoon Guards	Cavalry Order of Precedence	Succeeded by The Royal Lancers (Queen Elizabeth's Own)
