= Black Bob =

Black Bob may refer to:

- Black Bob (comics), a fictional dog
- Black Bob (horse), a British warhorse
- Black Bob (Shawnee chief) (d. 1862 or 1864), Native American Shawnee chief
- Black Bob (musician), American blues pianist
- Robert Craufurd (1764–1812), nicknamed Black Bob, Scottish soldier
- Robert Renfro (c. 1760s–1816), nicknamed Black Bob, enslaved-born African American tavern keeper, innkeeper, and entrepreneur
- Bob Tuckett (born 1948), nicknamed Black Bob, professional light heavyweight/cruiserweight boxer of the 1970s

== See also ==
- Bob Black (born 1951), American anarchist
- Bob Black (baseball) (1862–1933), American professional baseball player
- Robert Black (disambiguation)
