= Chris Vernon =

British Army officer

Christopher Vernon
- Born: Christopher Hilary Vernon
- Allegiance: United Kingdom
- Branch: British Army
- Rank: Colonel
- Commands: War in Afghanistan; Iraq War
- Education: Queen's Own Hussars: Queen's Royal Hussars

Colonel Christopher Hilary Vernon, MSM is a British Army officer. In 2003, Colonel Vernon gained international attention as the senior spokesman for the British Landforces during the 2003 invasion of Iraq.

Vernon was commissioned into the Queen's Own Hussars (later Queen's Royal Hussars) from the Royal Military Academy Sandhurst in 1976.

Prior to serving in Iraq and Afghanistan, Colonel Vernon served in Bosnia in 1995. During his time in Bosnia in 1995, he served as the spokesman for (UNPROFOR) under the command of General Sir Rupert Smith.

Most recently Vernon was the Chief of Staff for NATO forces in southern Afghanistan.

Colonel Vernon was cited in the Canada Gazette on 7 April 2007 having been decorated with the Canadian Meritorious Service Medal. The citation reads as follows: "Colonel Vernon of the British Army served as chief of staff of the Multinational Brigade — Regional Command South, in Afghanistan, from February to October 2006. A strategic thinker and master organizer, he established a multinational headquarters that began effective operations immediately upon entry into theatre. The success of combat operations was largely attributed to his planning abilities and knowledge of tactics and operations. He made an invaluable contribution to information operations, interacting with Afghan National Army Corps personnel and coordinating British resources. Through his actions supporting the strategic goals of the Canadian mission in Afghanistan, Colonel Vernon has brought great credit to the United Kingdom, to the Canadian Forces and to Canada."
