= Joseph Ward (VC) =

Irish recipient of the Victoria Cross (1832–1872)

- Born: 1832; Kinsale, County Cork
- Died: 23 November 1872 (aged 39–40); Longford, Ireland
- Burial place: St John's Churchyard, Longford
- Military career
- Allegiance: United Kingdom
- Branch: British Army
- Rank: Sergeant
- Units: 8th King's Royal Irish Hussars
- Conflicts: Indian Mutiny
- Awards: Victoria Cross

Joseph Ward VC (Irish: Seosamh Mac an Bháird; 1832 – 23 November 1872) was born in Kinsale, County Cork, and was an Irish recipient of the Victoria Cross, the highest and most prestigious award for gallantry in the face of the enemy that can be awarded to British and Commonwealth forces.

== Details ==
Ward was about 26 years old, and a sergeant in the 8th King's Royal Irish Hussars, British Army during the Indian Mutiny when the following deed took place for which he was awarded the VC. On 17 June 1858 at Gwalior, India, Sergeant Ward – together with Captain Clement Walker Heneage, Farrier George Hollis and Private John Pearson – was in a charge made by a squadron of the 8th Hussars when, supported by a division of the Bombay Horse Artillery and the 95th Regiment, they routed the enemy and captured two of the enemy's guns. Their citation read:

8th Hussars

Selected for the Victoria Cross by their companions in the gallant charge made by a squadron of the Regiment at Gwalior, on the 17th of June, 1858, when, supported by a division of the Bombay Horse Artillery, and Her Majesty's 95th Regiment, they routed the enemy, who were advancing against Brigadier Smith's position, charged through the rebel camp into two batteries, capturing and bringing into their camp two of the enemy's guns, under a heavy and converging fire from the Fort and Towa.

(Field Force Orders by Major-General Sir Hugh Henry Rose, G.C.B., Commanding Central India Field Force, dated Camp, Gwalior, 28th June, 1858.)

== Further information ==
He died at Longford on 23 November 1872.
