= Algernon Walker-Heneage-Vivian =

British Royal Navy Admiral (1871–1952)

Admiral Algernon Walker-Heneage-Vivian CB MVO DL
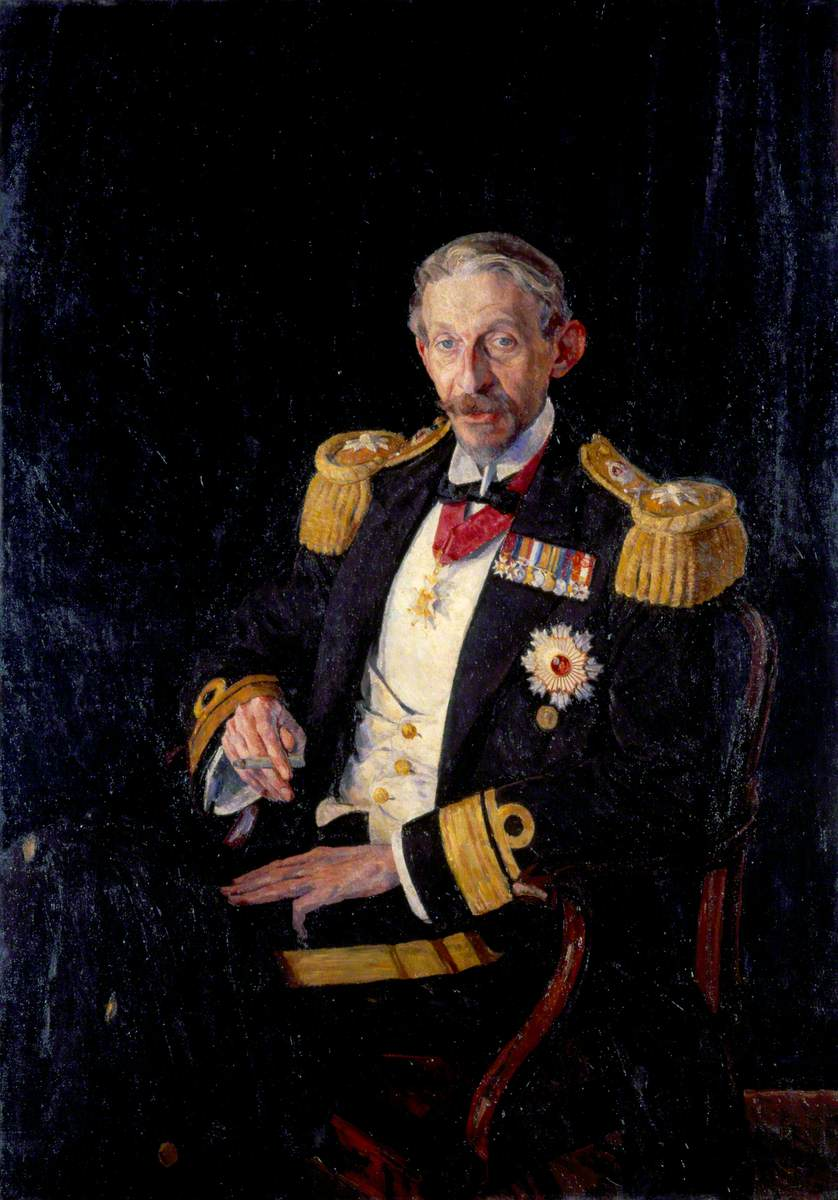
- Walker-Heneage-Vivian as a rear-admiral in 1920, by Evan Walters
- Born: 4 February 1871; Compton Bassett, Wiltshire, England
- Died: 26 February 1952 (aged 81); Blackpill, Swansea, Wales
- Relatives: Clement Walker Heneage (father)
- Military career
- Allegiance: United Kingdom
- Branch: Royal Navy
- Service years: 1886–1920
- Rank: Admiral
- Commands: Otranto Barrage; HMS Albion; HMS Hyacinth
- Conflicts: Second Boer War; First World War
- Awards: Companion of the Order of the Bath; Member of the Royal Victorian Order; Mentioned in Despatches; Officer of the Legion of Honour (France); Order of the Rising Sun, 2nd Class (Japan); Grand Officer of the Order of the Crown of Italy

Admiral Algernon Walker-Heneage-Vivian, CB, MVO, DL (4 February 1871 – 26 February 1952) was a senior Royal Navy officer of the early 20th century. His name was Algernon Walker Heneage during his service in the navy. He added his mother’s surname to his own in 1921.

== Early life ==
Walker-Heneage was born the third son of Major Clement Walker Heneage of Compton Bassett, Wiltshire and Henrietta Letitia Victoria on 4 February 1871. He was educated in part at Stubbington House School in Hampshire, known as the "cradle of the Navy". He assumed the surname of Walker-Heneage-Vivian by Royal Licence in 1921.

== Naval career ==
Walker-Heneage joined the Royal Navy in 1886, as a midshipman on the battleship HMS Triumph commanded by Algernon Heneage, a distant relative. He afterwards served on HMS Arthur in the Pacific and was promoted to commander in 1900. He thereafter served in many parts of the world, including Ladysmith, South Africa, when he was part of the contingent sent to defend the town during the Second Boer War. In 1907 he was promoted captain in command of the minelayer HMS Hyacinth, and in 1908 was given command of the First Squadron of Minelayers.

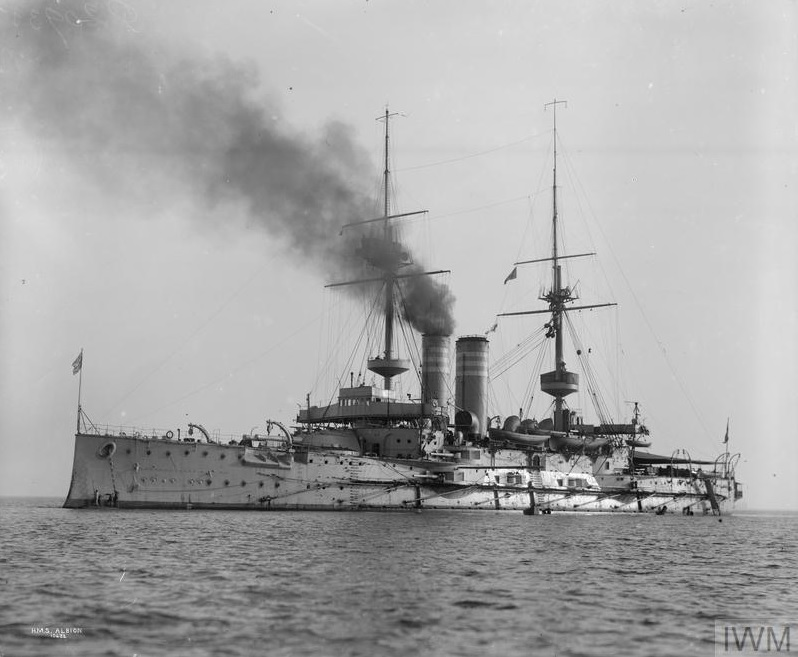
HMS Albion

Following the outbreak of the First World War in 1914, Walker-Heneage assumed command of the battleship HMS Albion. He took the ship on a secret mission to collect gold bullion from South Africa and was afterwards part of the naval support at the Gallipoli landings. In 1915–16 he was commodore commanding small vessels in the eastern Mediterranean, including 160 minesweepers and in 1916–17 was in charge of the allied barrage across the Strait of Otranto.

Walker-Heneage became Senior British Naval Officer in Italy and was promoted to rear admiral in 1918 and appointed an Aide-de-Camp to King George V in 1917–18. He retired from active service in 1920 and was promoted in retirement to vice admiral on 8 October 1923, and to admiral on 1 August 1927.

Walker-Heneage was invested as a Member of the Royal Victorian Order in 1904 and a Companion of the Order of the Bath in the 1916 New Year Honours. On 25 April 1922 he was made a Grand Officer of the Order of the Crown of Italy by the King of Italy.

== Later life ==
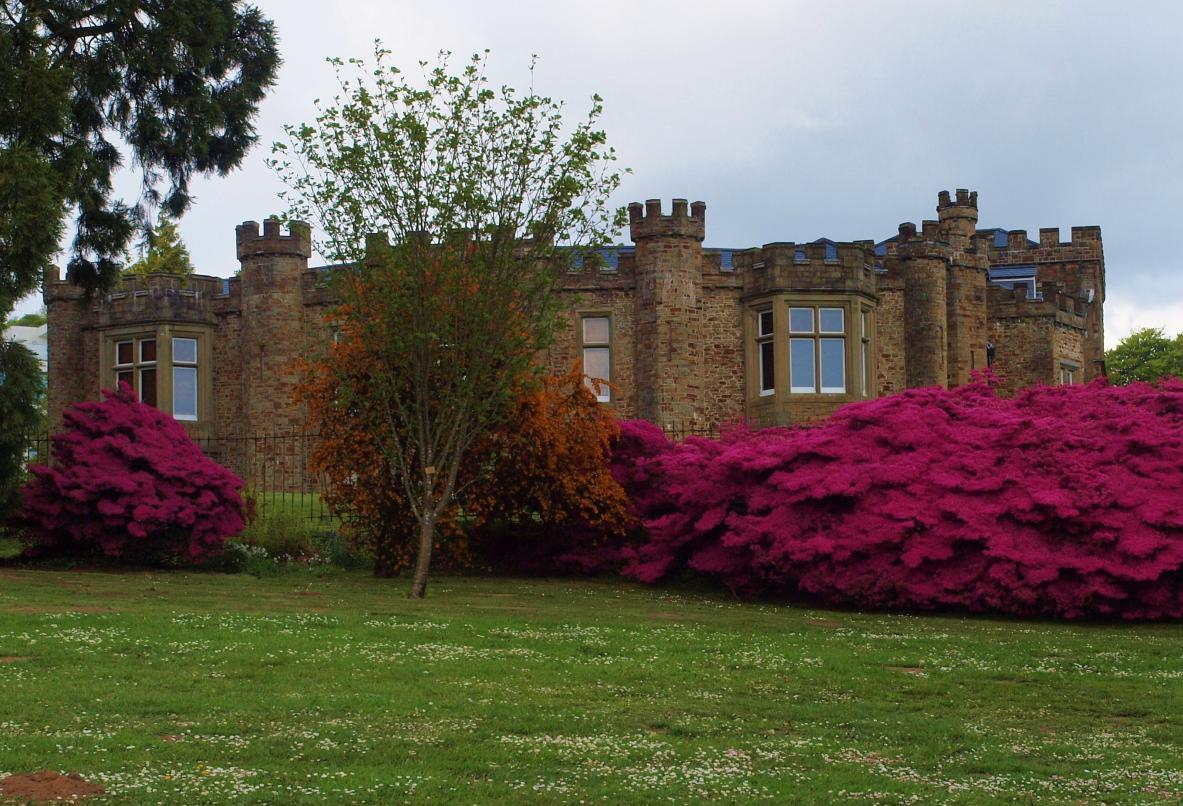
Clyne Castle

In retirement Walker-Heneage moved into Parc le Breos on the Gower peninsula near Bishopton, Swansea, which he inherited from the Vivian family. He afterwards moved to Clyne Castle, Blackpill, Swansea, which was also inherited from the Vivians. At that time (in 1921) he added the Vivian surname to his own. He served as a Justice of the Peace and a Deputy Lieutenant of Glamorganshire and was pricked High Sheriff of Glamorgan for 1926–27.

== Private life ==
Walker-Heneage-Vivian died at Clyne Castle in 1952. He had married twice. Firstly, in 1912 to Helen Mary, daughter of Captain Ernest de Vismes du Boulay, with whom he had three daughters. They were divorced in 1931 and he then married Beryl Stanley in Paddington later that year.

== Arms ==
Coat of arms of Algernon Walker-Heneage-Vivian
Adopted 1921 Crest 1 (on the helm)- Issuant from a bridge of one arch embattled and having at each end a tower Proper, a demi-hussar in the uniform of the 18th regiment, holding in his right hand a sabre and in his left a red pennon flying to the sinister (Vivian); 2 (sinister) a greyhound courant Sable differenced as in the arms (Heneage); 3 (dexter) a demi-heraldic tiger per pale indented Argent and Sable, armed and langued Gules maned and tufted Or (Walker). Escutcheon Quarterly, 1st and & 4th grand quarterings Or, on a chevron azure between three lions' heads erased Proper, as many annulets Gold; on a chief embattled Gules a wreath of oak Or between two martlets Argent (Vivian); 2nd & 3rd grand quarterings, sub-quarterly I & IV Or, a greyhound courant Sable between three leopards' faces Azure within a bordure engrailed Gules, on a mullet a crescent for difference (Heneage), II & III Azure a chevron engrailed Ermine between three plates each charged with a trefoil slipped Proper (Walker). Motto Walk in the fear of God.
