= Bob Tuckett =

Saint Kitts and Nevis boxer

Personal information
- Nickname: Black Bob
- Nationality: Saint Kitts and Nevis/British
- Born: Bob Tuckett; 10 October 1948 (age 77) Saint Kitts and Nevis
- Weight: light heavy/cruiserweight

Boxing career

Boxing record
- Total fights: 36
- Wins: 18
- Win by KO: 10
- Losses: 15
- Draws: 3
- No contests: 0

Bob Tuckett (born October 10, 1948 in Saint Kitts and Nevis), is a former professional light heavy/cruiserweight boxer of the 1970s, his professional fighting weight varied from 164.5 lb (74.6 kg; 11 st 10.5 lb), i.e. Light heavyweight to 178 lb (80.7 kg; 12 st 10.0 lb), i.e. Cruiserweight. Outside boxing he worked at Sharlston Colliery (Wakefield), and as a Bouncer in Wakefield, as of 2013 he lives in Leeds.

== Boxing career ==
=== Amateur ===
Reported amateur record W83 L7

=== Professional ===
Bob Tuckett's first professional boxing bout was a victory over Ade Ajasco on Monday 22 June 1970, this was followed by fights including; defeat by Johnny Frankham (British light heavyweight champion, and Southern (England) Area light heavyweight champion), two defeats to Geoff Shaw (Central (England) Area light heavyweight challenger), defeat by Roberto Gustavo Aguilar (Argentina (FAB) light heavyweight challenger, and Argentina (FAB) cruiserweight challenger) at Palazzetto dello Sport, Rome, Italy, defeat by Phil Matthews (British middleweight challenger), a draw, and victory over Terry Armstrong (Central Area light heavyweight challenger), defeat by Maxie Smith (Commonwealth light heavyweight challenger), victory over Jean Tshikuna at Brussels, Belgium, victory over, and defeat by Roy John (British light heavyweight challenger, Commonwealth light heavyweight challenger, and Welsh Area middleweight challenger), defeat by Rab Affleck (British light heavyweight challenger), Bob Tuckett's final professional bout was a defeat by Eddie Smith Monday 24 October 1977.
