= Black Bob (horse) =

British warhorse

Black Bob was a horse which was a mascot of the Eighth King's Royal Irish Light Dragoons mentioned in military history of the period. Black Bob was the horse of Sir Rollo Gillespie and had been foaled of an Irish mare at the Cape of Good Hope. Gillespie was killed while riding the horse at the Battle of Kalunga. The horse was put up for sale in the saddle and trappings still stained with Gillespie's blood and purchased by troops of the Irish Dragoons themselves and became a regimental mascot. On retirement he was sold to a civilian at Cawnpore.
