= James Champion =

Recipient of the Victoria Cross

James Champion VC MSM
- Born: 1834; Hammersmith, London
- Died: 4 May 1904 (aged 69-70); Hammersmith
- Burial place: Hammersmith Cemetery
- Military career
- Allegiance: United Kingdom
- Branch: British Army
- Rank: Troop Sergeant-Major
- Units: 8th Hussars; Royal Gloucestershire Hussars
- Conflicts: Crimean War; Indian Mutiny
- Awards: Victoria Cross; Meritorious Service Medal

James Champion VC MSM (1834 – 4 May 1904) was an English recipient of the Victoria Cross, the highest and most prestigious award for gallantry in the face of the enemy that can be awarded to British and Commonwealth forces.

== Details ==
Champion was approximately 24 years old, and a Troop Sergeant-Major in the 8th King's Royal Irish Hussars, British Army during the Indian Mutiny when the following deed took place on 8 September 1858 at Beejapore, India, for which he was awarded the VC:

Troop Serjeant-Major James Champion. Date of Act of Bravery, 8th September, 1858
For distinguished bravery at Beejapore on the 8th of September, 1858, when both the Officers attached to the Troop were disabled, and himself severely wounded at the commencement of the action by a ball through his body, in having continued at his duty forward, throughout the pursuit, and disabled several of the Enemy with his pistol. Also recommended for distinguished conduct at Gwalior.

He later joined the Royal Gloucestershire Hussars.

== The medal ==
The medal is displayed at Eastbourne Redoubt Fortress Museum, Royal Parade, Eastbourne, East Sussex
