= Clement Heneage =

Recipient of the Victoria Cross

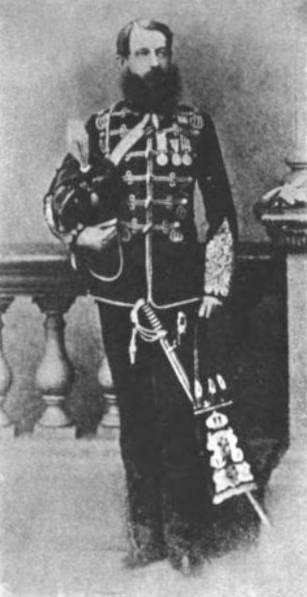
- Born: Clement Walker Heneage; 6 March 1831; Compton Bassett, Calne, Wiltshire
- Died: 9 December 1901 (aged 70); Compton Bassett, Calne, Wiltshire
- Burial place: St Swithun's Church, Compton Bassett
- Relatives: George Heneage Walker Heneage (father); Algernon Walker-Heneage-Vivian (son)
- Military career
- Allegiance: United Kingdom
- Branch: British Army
- Service years: 1851–1869
- Rank: Major
- Unit: 8th Hussars
- Conflicts: Crimean War: Battle of the Alma; Battle of Balaclava; Charge of the Light Brigade; Battle of Inkerman; Battle of the Chernaya; Siege of Sevastopol; Indian Mutiny
- Awards: Victoria Cross

Clement Walker Heneage, VC (6 March 1831 – 9 December 1901) was a British Army officer and a recipient of the Victoria Cross, the highest award for gallantry in the face of the enemy that can be awarded to British and Commonwealth forces. In later life he was a justice of the peace and High Sheriff of Wiltshire.

== Early life ==
Heneage was born in 1831, the eldest son of George Heneage Walker Heneage, the Member of Parliament for Devizes from 1838 to 1857.

== Army career ==
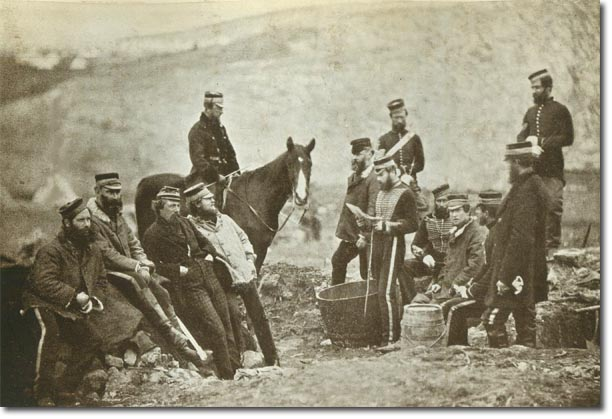
A group of officers, 8th Hussars, Heneage is third from the right. Photograph by Roger Fenton, Crimea, September 1855.

In August 1851, by purchase, Heneage was commissioned as a Cornet into the 8th Light Dragoons and on 3 September 1854 was promoted to Lieutenant. He was soon serving in the Crimean War and was present at many engagements of that campaign, including the battles of Alma, Balaclava, Inkerman, Tchernaïa, and the Siege of Sevastopol. He rode in the Charge of the Light Brigade at the Battle of Balaclava. In May 1857, he was promoted to Captain.

At the end of the Crimean War, Heneage proceeded to India with his regiment, which took part in suppressing the Indian Mutiny (1857–1858) in Rajputana and Central India. He was present at the capture of Kotah, the reoccupation of Chundaree, the battle of Kotah ke Serai, the capture of Gwalior and of Powree, the battle of Sindwaho, and the action of Koorwye and Naharghur

=== Victoria Cross ===
Heneage was 27 years old, and a captain in the 8th Hussars, during the Indian Mutiny when the following deed took place for which he was awarded the VC.

On 17 June 1858 at Gwalior, British India, Captain Heneage took part in a charge by a squadron of the 8th Hussars. Four men in this action, Heneage, Joseph Ward, George Hollis and John Pearson were awarded the Victoria Cross, the joint citation reading as follows:

8th Hussars, Captain (now Brevet-Major) Clement Walker Heneage, No. 1584 Sergeant Joseph Ward, No. 1298 Farrier George Hollis, No. 861 Private John Pearson: Date of Act of Bravery 17th June, 1858. Selected for the Victoria Cross by their companions in the gallant charge made by a squadron of the Regiment at Gwalior, on the 17th of June, 1858, when, supported by a division of the Bombay Horse Artillery, and Her Majesty's 95th Regiment, they routed the enemy, who were advancing against Brigadier Smith's position, charged through the rebel camp into two batteries, capturing and bringing into their camp two of the enemy's guns, under a heavy and converging fire from the Fort and Town. (Field Force Orders by Major-General Sir Hugh Henry Rose, G.C.B., Commanding Central India Field Force, dated Camp, Gwalior, 28th June, 1858.)

== Later life ==
Heneage retired from the army in 1868. He succeeded to the family estates on his father's death in 1875, and "devoted himself to the life and duties of a country gentleman" in Wiltshire.

He was appointed High Sheriff of Wiltshire for 1887. He lived at Compton House, Compton Bassett, Wiltshire, and in the 1901 United Kingdom census his occupation was stated as justice of the peace. At that time he had thirteen servants, including a butler, a cook, a coachman, a groom, and two footmen.

Clement Walker Heneage died suddenly at Compton House on 9 December 1901.

== Family ==
In 1865, Heneage married Henrietta Vivian, daughter of John Henry Vivian, of Singleton, Glamorgan, with whom he had one daughter and four sons. Their son Algernon became a Royal Navy admiral.
