= John Pearson (VC) =

English recipient of the Victoria Cross

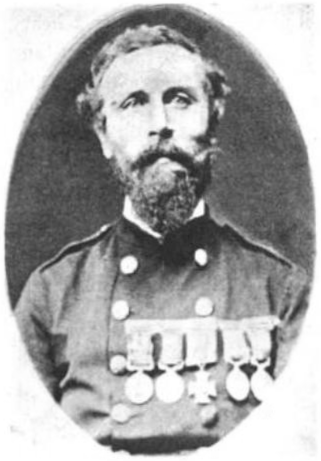
- Born: 19 January 1825; Leeds, West Riding of Yorkshire
- Died: 18 April 1892 (aged 67); Lion's Head, Bruce County, Ontario, Canada
- Burial place: Eastnor Township Cemetery, Lion's Head
- Military career
- Allegiance: United Kingdom
- Branch: British Army
- Rank: Sergeant
- Units: 8th Hussars; 19th Hussars
- Conflicts: Crimean War; Indian Mutiny
- Awards: Victoria Cross; Meritorious Service Medal

John Pearson VC (19 January 1825 – 18 April 1892) was an English recipient of the Victoria Cross, the highest and most prestigious award for gallantry in the face of the enemy that can be awarded to members of the British and Commonwealth forces.

== Details ==
John Pearson was born 19 January 1825 in Leeds, Yorkshire, England. He married Selina Smart in the General Baptist Church in Trowbridge, Wiltshire, England on 6 April 1851. He was aged 25 and was a private in the 8th Hussars, living in the barracks in Trowbridge, the son of Stephen Pearson, a gardener. Selina Smart is shown as age 20, a spinner, a feeder by profession, living on Stallard Street, daughter of Edward Smart, a spinner.

He was 33 years old and a private in the 8th Hussars (The King's Royal Irish), British Army during the Indian Mutiny when the following deed took place, on 17 June 1858 at Gwalior, British India, Pearson took part in a charge by a squadron of the 8th Hussars. Four men in this action, Pearson, Clement Walker Heneage, Joseph Ward, and George Hollis were awarded the Victoria Cross, the joint citation reading as follows:

8th Hussars, Captain (now Brevet-Major) Clement Walker Heneage, No. 1584 Sergeant Joseph Ward, No. 1298 Farrier George Hollis, No. 861 Private John Pearson: Date of Act of Bravery 17th June, 1858. Selected for the Victoria Cross by their companions in the gallant charge made by a squadron of the Regiment at Gwalior, on the 17th of June, 1858, when, supported by a division of the Bombay Horse Artillery, and Her Majesty's 95th Regiment, they routed the enemy, who were advancing against Brigadier Smith's position, charged through the rebel camp into two batteries, capturing and bringing into their camp two of the enemy's guns, under a heavy and converging fire from the Fort and Town. (Field Force Orders by Major-General Sir Hugh Henry Rose, G.C.B., Commanding Central India Field Force, dated Camp, Gwalior, 28th June, 1858.)

== Further information ==
He later achieved the rank of sergeant with the 19th Hussars and was awarded the Meritorious Service Medal. He died on 18 April 1892 in Lion's Head, Eastnor Township, Bruce County, Ontario after emigrating to Canada.

== The medal ==
His VC was auctioned by Morton & Eden Ltd of London on 23 November 2004 and is now on display in the Lord Ashcroft Gallery at the Imperial War Museum, London.
