= George Hollis (VC) =

English recipient of the Victoria Cross (1833–1879)

- Born: October 1833; Chipping Sodbury, Gloucestershire
- Died: 16 May 1879 (aged 45); Exeter, Devon
- Burial place: Exwick Cemetery, Exeter
- Military career
- Allegiance: United Kingdom
- Branch: British Army
- Rank: Farrier
- Unit: 8th Hussars
- Conflicts: Indian Mutiny
- Awards: Victoria Cross

George Hollis VC (October 1833 – 16 May 1879) was an English recipient of the Victoria Cross, the highest and most prestigious award for gallantry in the face of the enemy that can be awarded to British and Commonwealth forces.

== Details ==
He was about 24 years old, and a Farrier in the 8th Hussars (The King's Royal Irish), British Army during the Indian Mutiny when the following deed took place on 17 June 1858 at Gwalior, India for which he was awarded the VC: Farrier Hollis - together with a captain (Clement Walker Heneage), a sergeant (Joseph Ward) and a private (John Pearson) was in a charge made by a squadron of the 8th Hussars. His citation reads:

8th Hussars. No. 1298. Farrier George Hollis

Selected for the Victoria Cross by their companions in the gallant charge made by a squadron of the Regiment at Gwalior, on the 17th of June, 1858, when, supported by a division of the Bombay Horse Artillery, and Her Majesty's 95th Regiment, they routed the enemy, who were advancing against Brigadier Smith's position, charged through the rebel camp into two batteries, capturing and bringing into their camp two of the enemy's guns, under a heavy and converging fire from the Fort and Towa.

(Field Force Orders by Major-General Sir Hugh Henry Rose, G.C.B., Commanding Central India Field Force, dated Camp, Gwalior, 28th June, 1858.)

== Medal ==
In 1994 a man watching racehorses being trained on the Curragh in County Kildare, Ireland, glimpsed a small piece of metal being thrown up with mud by a horse galloping by; this turned out to be a Victoria Cross (minus its bar). It was presumed to have been one of the four awarded to the 8th Hussars, as they were based at the Curragh between 1869 and 1875. Until 1881 soldiers were required to wear all their medals while on duty and it was believed that a member of the Hussars could have lost the medal while training on horseback on the Curragh. It was thought likely that the medal belonged to either George Hollis or John Pearson as the other two medals were accounted for; however, Pearson's VC subsequently turned up in auction at 2004, along with his other medals.
