= King's Royal Hussars =

Armoured regiment of the British Army

The King's Royal Hussars
- Cap badge of the King's Royal Hussars
- Active: 2 December 1992-
- Allegiance: United Kingdom
- Branch: British Army
- Type: Line cavalry
- Role: Tank warfare
- Size: One regiment
- Part of: Royal Armoured Corps
- Garrison/HQ: HHQ - Winchester; Regiment - Tidworth
- March: Quick - The King's Royal Hussars; Slow - Coburg; Other - The Eagle

Commanders
- Commanding Officer: Lt Col David Welford MBE
- Colonel-in-Chief: Anne, Princess Royal
- Colonel of the Regiment: Brigadier J. Nicholas N. Orr

Insignia
- Tactical Recognition Flash

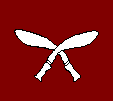
- Arm Badge: Crossed Kukris; From 14th/20th King's Hussars
- Abbreviation: KRH

The King's Royal Hussars (KRH) is an armoured regiment of the British Army formed in 1992. Based at Tidworth it serves as one of the armoured regiments of the 12th Armoured Brigade Combat Team (ABCT).

== History ==
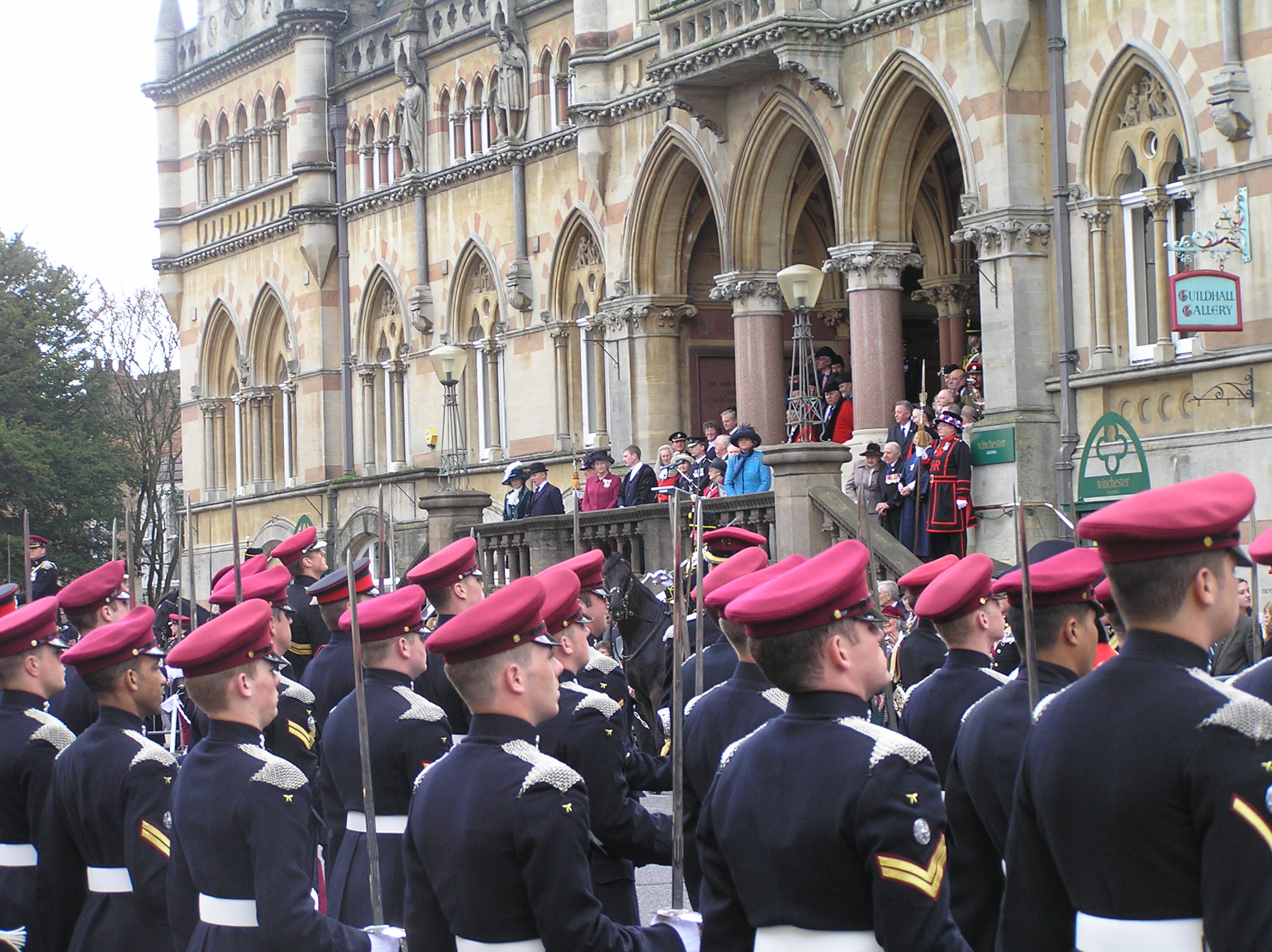
The King's Royal Hussars receiving the Freedom of Winchester from the Princess Royal (2006)

The regiment was formed on 4 December 1992 by the amalgamation of two other regiments:

- The Royal Hussars (Prince of Wales's Own) (an amalgamation of the 10th Royal Hussars (Prince of Wales's Own) and 11th Hussars (Prince Albert's Own)) and
- 14th/20th King's Hussars (an amalgamation of the 14th King's Hussars and 20th Hussars).

=== Deployments ===
The regiment was based at York Barracks in Münster at the time of amalgamation from where it deployed units to Northern Ireland on Operation Banner in June 1994 and to Bosnia and Herzegovina in January 1996.

The regiment deployed units to Bosnia and Herzegovina again in June 1997 and to both Bosnia and Herzegovina and Kosovo in autumn 1999. The regiment returned to Aliwal Barracks at Tidworth Camp in March 2000 from where it deployed units to Northern Ireland in October 2002; it also deployed units to Iraq on Operation Telic 1 in June 2003, Operation Telic 6 in May 2005 and Operation Telic 10 in June 2007. The regiment also deployed on Operation Herrick 7 in September 2007 and Operation Herrick 16 in April 2012.

== Organisation ==
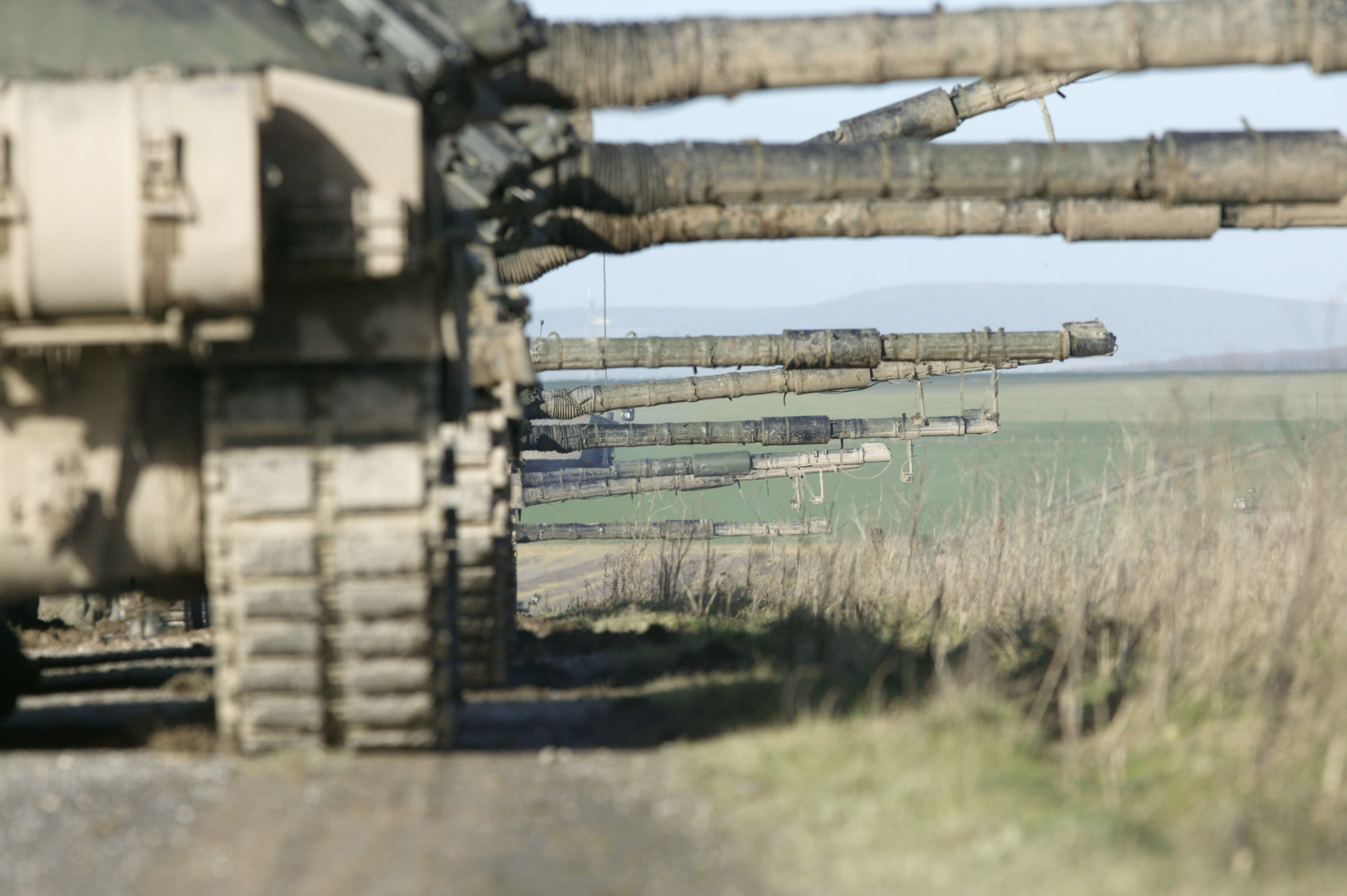
Challenger 2 tanks from the King's Royal Hussars on Salisbury Plain (2006)

The regiment currently serves in the armoured role, equipped with Challenger 2 tanks, and is based in Tidworth, Wiltshire. The regiment is organised into a total of five squadrons, each of which perpetuates the title of one of its antecedent regiments:

- A Squadron (The Twentieth Hussar Squadron)
- B Squadron (The Fourteenth Hussar Squadron)
- C Squadron (The Eleventh Hussar Squadron)
- D Squadron (The Tenth Hussar Squadron)
- HQ Squadron

C Squadron traditionally is the senior squadron of the King's Royal Hussars in perpetuation of the honour accorded to C Squadron the 11th Hussars in Egypt.

As part of the Future Soldier reforms, the regiment's reconnaissance troop (known as recce troop) will be equipped with Ajax armoured fighting vehicles.

== Traditions ==
=== Uniform ===
==== Crimson trousers ====
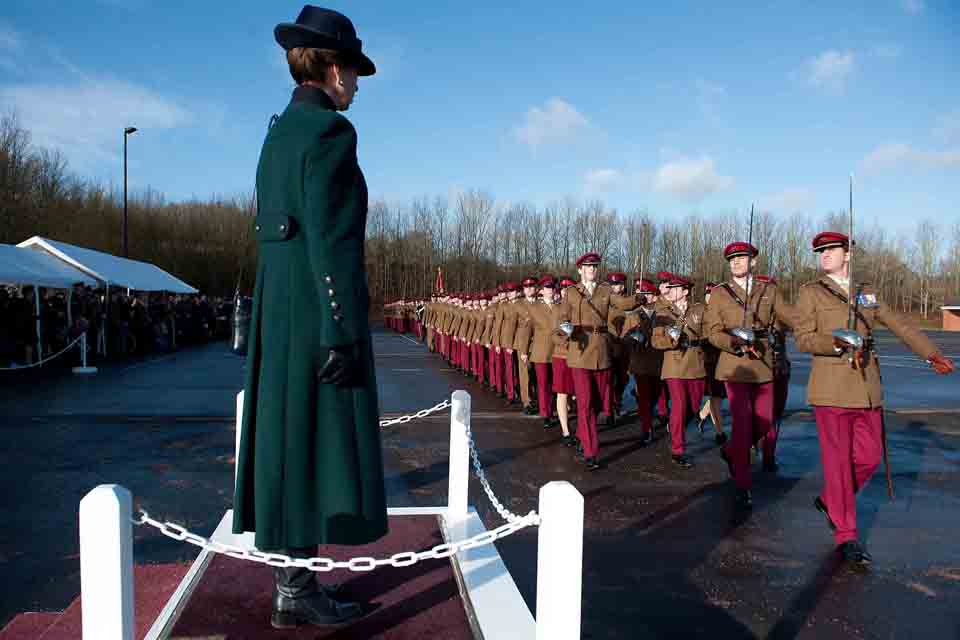
On parade in No2 Service Dress (2012)

The regiment wears crimson trousers when in full dress, No. 1 dress or No. 2 dress, and (for officers and NCOs) mess dress. They may also be worn in shirt sleeve order by officers, including those on secondment to the regiment from other units. This distinctive feature, which is unique in the British Army, derives from the honour accorded to the 11th Hussars by Prince Albert, the future consort of Queen Victoria. The regiment, then based at Canterbury, formed the escort for the Prince from his arrival at Dover en route to his wedding in London. The Prince was so impressed with the bearing and turnout of the troops that he ordered that they should henceforth wear his livery as a mark of distinction.

==== Brown beret ====
The regiment wears a unique brown beret. This practice began when the 11th Hussars were mechanized in 1928. It was found that the traditional forage cap with a peak was inconvenient when peering through an armoured vehicle gunsight, so it was decided to adopt a beret. It is believed that the brown colour was selected by the then quartermaster's wife as a practical choice for working with oily vehicles, rather than horses. The beret was originally worn without a cap badge but with a broad crimson band. On amalgamation with the 10th Hussars PWO (the senior regiment of the two), who had a red patch behind their cap badge, it was agreed in discussions between representatives of both regiments (10th and 11th) to retain the patch but the colour was changed to crimson to represent the crimson band. Since 2003 the Royal Wessex Yeomanry has also worn the brown beret.

=== Gurkhas ===
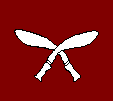

The regiment wear the crossed kukri of the Gurkhas as an arm badge. This relates back to 1945 when C Squadron, 14th/20th King's Hussars assaulted the town of Medicina in Italy alongside the 2nd Battalion, 6th Gurkha Rifles, inflicting heavy losses on the German defenders despite being outnumbered. In commemoration of this action the 14th/20th King's Hussars adopted the crossed kukri badge, a tradition maintained by the regiment.

=== The Emperor ===
During the Battle of Vitoria in June 1813, the 14th Light Dragoons captured from a French baggage train, a silver chamber pot belonging to King Joseph Bonaparte which he had received from his brother, Emperor Napoleon. The regiment gained the regimental nickname of "The Emperor's Chambermaids" and retained the chamber pot as a loving cup known as "The Emperor". The King's Royal Hussars, as the successor to the 14th Light Dragoons, still retain "The Emperor", and their officers drink from it on mess nights.

== Regimental museum ==
"HorsePower: The Museum of the King's Royal Hussars" is the regiment's museum and forms part of Winchester's Military Museums in Winchester, Hampshire.

== Colonel-in-Chief ==
- 1992–present: General Princess Anne, The Princess Royal KG KT GCVO GCStJ QSO GCL CMM CD ADC

== Regimental Colonels ==
Colonels of the Regiment have been:

- 1992–1997: Maj-Gen. John Peter William Friedberger, CB, CBE (ex Royal Hussars)
- 1997–2002: Brig. Euan Charles Wortham Morrison, OBE
- 2002–2007: Brig. Christopher Keith Price, CBE
- 2007–2012: Colonel David Woodd
- 2012–2017: General Sir Richard Shirreff, KCB CBE
- 2017–2022: General Sir Adrian Bradshaw, KCB OBE DL
- 2022–present: Brigadier J. Nicholas N. Orr

== Commanding Officers ==
Commanding Officers have included:

- 1992–1994: Lieutenant Colonel David J. B. Woodd
- 1994–1996: Lt Col Alexander Richard David Shirreff
- 1996–1998: Lt Col Adrian John Bradshaw
- 1998–2001: Lt Col Jonathan J. Powe
- 2001–2003: Lt Col Timothy C. Allen
- 2003–2005: Lt Col S. Toby W. Bridge
- 2005–2008: Lt Col J. Nicholas N. Orr
- 2008–2010: Lt Col Giles R. M. Harrison
- 2010–2013: Lt Col Alexander T. L. Potts
- 2013–2015: Lt Col Justin J. Kingsford
- 2015–2017: Lt Col James D. H. Porter
- 2017–2020: Lt Col Angus M. A. Tilney MC
- 2020–2023: Lt Col Will D. Hodgkinson MBE
- 2023–2024: Lt Col Pete Perowne
- 2024 – Present: Lt Col David T. M. Welford MBE

== Notable officers ==
- Alexander Windsor, Earl of Ulster
- Jamie Snowden – National Hunt racehorse trainer

== Lineage ==
1881 Childers Reforms	1922 Amalgamations	1966 Defence White Paper	1990 Options for Change - today
10th (Prince Of Wales's Own Royal) Hussars		Royal Hussars (Prince of Wales's Own)	King's Royal Hussars
11th (Prince Albert's Own) Hussars		Royal Hussars (Prince of Wales's Own)	King's Royal Hussars
14th (The King's) Hussars	14th/20th King's Hussars		King's Royal Hussars
20th Hussars	14th/20th King's Hussars		King's Royal Hussars

== Alliances ==
- Canada - 1st Hussars
- Australia - 10th Light Horse
- Australia - 2nd/14th Light Horse Regiment (Queensland Mounted Infantry)
- Australia - 4th/19th Prince of Wales's Light Horse
- New Zealand - Queen Alexandra's Mounted Rifles
- Pakistan - The Guides Cavalry (Frontier Force)
- Zambia - Zambia Armoured Car Regiment
- Royal Navy - HMS Dauntless
- Royal Air Force - IX(B) Squadron
- France – 5e Régiment de Dragons

=== Affiliated Yeomanry ===
- The Royal Wiltshire Yeomanry (Prince of Wales's Own)
- The Royal Gloucestershire Hussars
- The Duke of Lancaster's Own Yeomanry

== Order of precedence ==
Preceded by The Royal Lancers	Cavalry Order of Precedence	Succeeded by Light Dragoons
