= HorsePower: The Museum of the King's Royal Hussars =

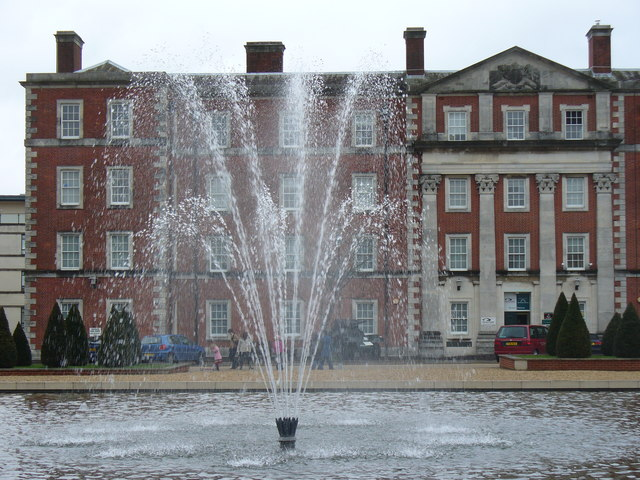
- Fountain outside the museum

- Location of the museum within Hampshire
- Location: Peninsula Barracks, Romsey Road, Winchester, Hampshire
- Coordinates: 51°03′44.7″N 1°19′13.5″W
- Type: Military Museum
- Accreditation: Museums, Libraries and Archives Council
- Parking: On site
- Website: www.horsepowermuseum.co.uk

HorsePower: The Museum of the King's Royal Hussars is a military museum in Winchester, Hampshire, that is dedicated to documenting the King's Royal Hussars, a cavalry regiment of the British Army. The museum is one of the founding members of Winchester's Military Museums, a partnership of six museums located in the Peninsula Barracks, Winchester. The museum contains exhibits spanning three centuries of two of the Royal Hussar regiments; the 10th Royal Hussars (Prince of Wales's own) and the 11th Royal Hussars (Prince Albert's own), as well as the Royal Hussars (Prince of Wales's own), which became The King's Royal Hussars in 1992.

== Exhibits ==
The museum has a range of exhibits, including military uniforms, medals, weapons, military models, equipment and armoured vehicles. The exhibits are supplemented by audio-visual displays, virtual tours, photographs, and life-sized model horses.

The museum also shows several paintings which illustrate a wide range of subjects including former important generals such as Major General Sir John Douglas, who commanded the 11th Hussars at the Charge of the Light Brigade and the scenery of South Africa during the Boer War is illustrated in The Race for the Kopje by Godfrey Douglas Giles, presented alongside a showcase containing many objects shown in the picture, such as spears, a shield and a sword.

The museum has a replica dugout, where visitors can experience First World War trench warfare. Another notable exhibit is a diorama depicting the aftermath of the Charge of the Light Brigade at the Battle of Balaclava in the Crimean War. Exhibits also explore the stories of cavalrymen in the Boer War, including Henry William Engleheart, who received the Victoria Cross for rescuing a comrade and his horse under heavy shell fire and Sir John Milbanke, 10th Baronet, who received the Victoria Cross for rescuing a comrade under fire despite being severely injured himself.

The story of Alexander Roberts Dunn, who was awarded the Victoria Cross for saving the lives of two comrades during the Charge of the Light Brigade of the Crimean War, is also illustrated.

== Facilities ==
The museum has a shop which sells a range of military-related products and memorabilia, and there is a nearby cafe, Copper Joes, also located in the Peninsula Barracks. The Museum also holds the Archive of the 10th Hussars, 11th Hussars, 14th Hussars, 20th Hussars, 14th/20th King's Hussars and the Royal Hussars.
