= Horse power (disambiguation) =

Horsepower is a unit of measurement of power.

Horse power may also refer to:

- Horse power (machine) or horse engine, a machine powered by a horse
- Horse Power (song), a song by the Chemical Brothers
- HorsePower: The Museum of the King's Royal Hussars, a military museum in Winchester, Hampshire, England
