= General Lyttelton =

General Lyttelton may refer to:

- Sir Charles Lyttelton, 3rd Baronet (1628–1716), British Army brigadier general
- Neville Lyttelton (1845–1931), British Army general
- Richard Lyttelton (1718–1770), British Army lieutenant general

== See also ==
- Arthur Lyttelton-Annesley (1837–1926), British Army lieutenant general
