= 1875 Birthday Honours =

Appointments by Queen Victoria to various orders and honours

The 1875 Birthday Honours were appointments by Queen Victoria to various orders and honours to reward and highlight good works by citizens of the British Empire. The appointments were made to celebrate the official birthday of the Queen, and were published in The London Gazette in May and June 1875.

The recipients of honours are displayed here as they were styled before their new honour, and arranged by honour, with classes (Knight, Knight Grand Cross, etc.) and then divisions (Military, Civil, etc.) as appropriate.

== United Kingdom and British Empire ==
=== Baron ===
- Cospatrick Alexander, Earl of Home, by the name, style, and title of Baron Douglas, of Douglas, in the county of Lanark
- George, Earl of Dalhousie CB Vice-Admiral on the Retired List of Her Majesty's Fleet, by the name, style, and title of Baron Ramsay, of Glenmark, in the county of Forfar
- Arthur Edward Holland Grey Egerton, commonly called Viscount Grey de Wilton, by the name, style, and title of Baron Grey de Radcliffe, in the county palatine of Lancaster

=== The Most Honourable Order of the Bath ===
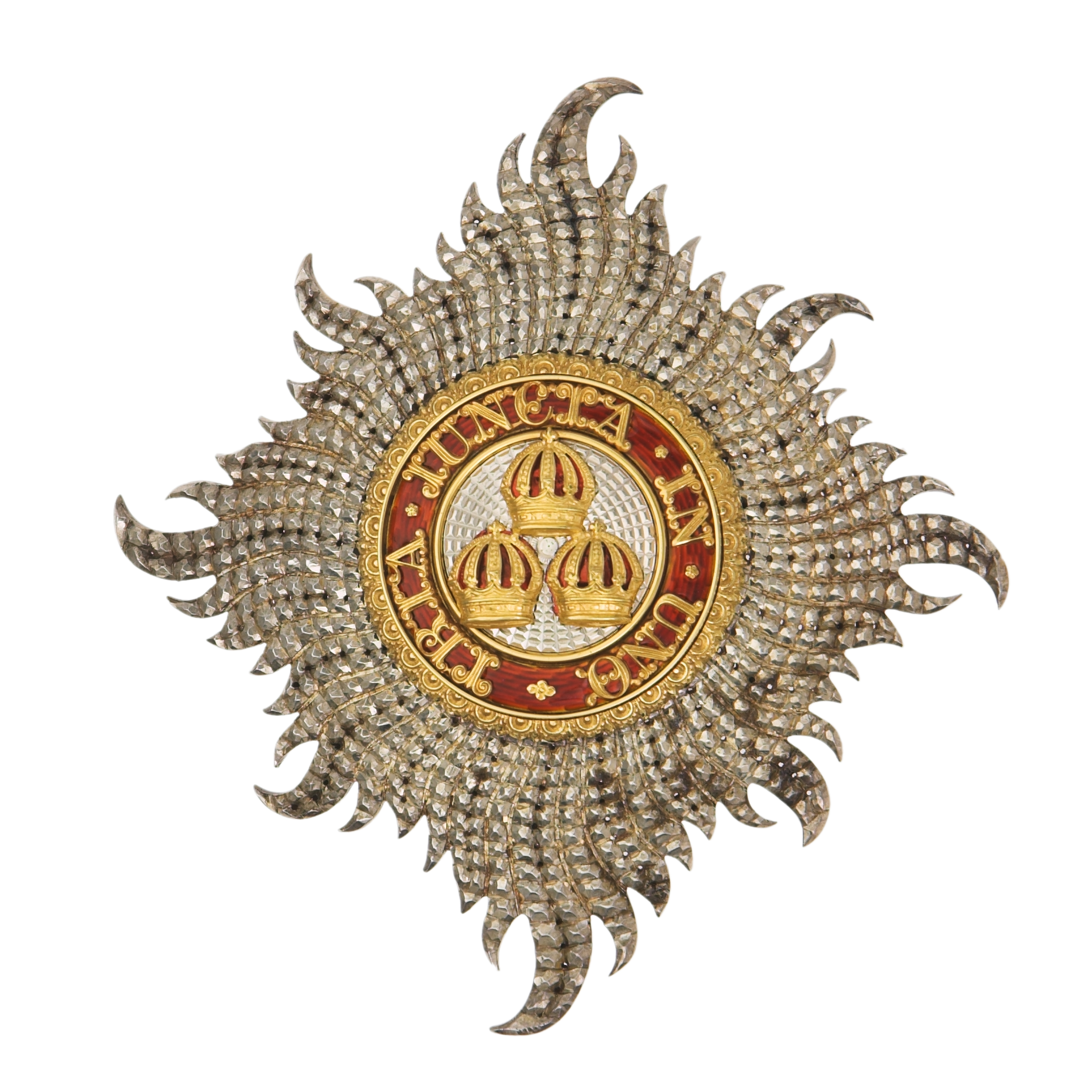
Civilian star of the Knight Grand Cross of the Order of the Bath

==== Knight Grand Cross of the Order of the Bath (GCB) ====
===== Military Division =====
Royal Navy

- Vice-Admiral Sir Hastings Reginald Yelverton KCB

Army

- General Sir Thomas Reed KCB
- General Henry, Lord Rokeby KCB
- General Sir John Bloomfield Gough KCB
- General Sir Charles Thomas Van Straubenzee
- Lieutenant-General the Honourable Sir Augustus Almeric Spencer KCB
- Lieutenant-General Sir Charles Shepherd Stuart KCB
- Lieutenant-General Sir John Garvock KCB
- Lieutenant-General Sir Neville Bowles Chamberlain GCSI KCB
- Major-General Sir Alfred Hastings Horsford KCB

==== Knight Commander of the Order of the Bath (KCB) ====
===== Military Division =====
Royal Navy

- Vice-Admiral Richard Collinson CB
- Vice-Admiral Claude Henry Mason Buckle CB
- Vice-Admiral George Giffard CB
- Vice-Admiral William Loring CB
- Vice-Admiral Edward Southwell Sotheby CB

Army

- Lieutenant-General Burke Cuppage
- Lieutenant-General the Honourable George Cadogan CB
- Lieutenant-General Sir Francis Seymour Bt CB
- Lieutenant-General William O'Grady Haly CB
- Lieutenant-General Edward Alan Holdich CB
- Major-General Edwin Beaumont Johnson CB
- Major-General Henry Daly CB
- Surgeon-General John Campbell Brown CB Bengal Army

==== Companion of the Order of the Bath (CB) ====
===== Military Division =====
Royal Navy

- Vice-Admiral Thomas Henry Mason
- Captain Samuel Hoskins Derriman
- Captain the Honourable Henry Carr Glyn
- Captain George Fiott Day VC
- Captain Richard Vesey Hamilton
- Captain Radulphus Bryce Oldfield
- Captain Charles Murray-Aynsley
- Captain John Eglinton Montgomerie
- Captain Henry James Raby VC
- Captain William Charles Fahie Wilson
- Captain John Halliday Care
- Captain James Graham Goodenough
- Captain Nowell Salmon VC
- Captain Frederick William Gough
- Captain Henry Duncan Grant

Army

- Lieutenant-General William Raikes Faber, 17th Regiment
- Lieutenant-General David Pott, Bengal Staff Corps
- Major-General Charles Lennox Brownlow Maitland
- Major-General William Charles Forrest
- Major-General Richard Hamilton, Madras Staff Corps
- Colonel James Conolly
- Colonel George Bryan Milman, late 5th Regiment
- Colonel Henry Le Geyt Bruce, Royal (late Bengal) Artillery
- Colonel Henry Hastings Affleck Wood, Bombay Staff Corps
- Colonel Francis Adam Ellis Loch, Bombay Staff Corps
- Colonel Henry Knightley Burne, Bengal Staff Corps
- Colonel Charles Terrington Aitchison, Bombay Staff Corps
- Colonel Mark Walker VC 45th Regiment
- Colonel Philip Gossett Piara, Royal Artillery
- Colonel Alexander Abercrombie Nelson, late Depot Battalion
- Colonel Patrick Robertson-Ross, late Depot Battalion
- Colonel Henry Lowther Chermside, Royal Artillery
- Colonel Hugh Rowlands VC 34th Regiment
- Colonel Frederick Ernest Appleyard, 85th Regiment
- Colonel Thomas Maunsell, Brigade Depot
- Colonel Francis Fisher Hamilton, 4th Regiment
- Colonel the Honourable Ivo de Vesci Twisleton-Wykeham-Fiennes, late 9th Lancers
- Lieutenant-Colonel Charles Henry Ingilby, Royal Artillery
- Lieutenant-Colonel Joseph Jordan, 41st Regiment
- Lieutenant-Colonel Philip Ravenhill, Royal Engineers
- Lieutenant-Colonel Charles John Stanley Gough VC Bengal Cavalry
- Lieutenant-Colonel George Hutchinson CSI Bengal Staff Corps
- Lieutenant-Colonel Harry North Dalrymple Prendergast VC Royal (late Madras) Engineers
- Lieutenant-Colonel Henry Edward Hillman Burnside, late 88th Regiment
- Lieutenant-Colonel George Murray Miller, 79th Regiment
- Lieutenant-Colonel Frederick George Pym, Royal Marine Light Infantry

=== The Most Distinguished Order of Saint Michael and Saint George ===
Star of the Order of Saint Michael and Saint George

==== Knight Commander of the Order of St Michael and St George (KCMG) ====
- Francis Fortescue Turville CMG
- The Honourable Viscount Kirkwall CMG
- Charles Sladen CMG
- Julius Vogel CMG

==== Companion of the Order of St Michael and St George (CMG) ====
- Sir Henry Thurstan Holland Bt MP formerly Legal Adviser, and subsequently Assistant Under-Secretary of State for the Colonies
- Captain George Cumine Strahan RA Governor and Commander-in-Chief of the Gold Coast Colony
- Captain James Graham Goodenough RN, Commodore Commanding Her Majesty's Naval Forces on the Australian Station, lately employed as Commissioner to inquire into the offer of the cession of the Fiji Islands
- Edgar Leopold Layard, Consul for Her Majesty at the Fiji Islands, lately employed as Commissioner to inquire into the offer of the cession of those Islands, and now acting as Administrator of the Government of the Colony of Fiji
- William Charles Sargeaunt, Crown Agent for the Colonies
- Colonel John Dyde, late Colonel-Commandant of Militia in the District of Montreal, in the Dominion of Canada
- Colonel John Sewell, late Colonel-Commandant of the District of Quebec, in the Dominion of Canada
