= John Friedberger =

British Army general

Major-General John Friedberger CB CBE
- Born: 27 May 1937 (age 89)
- Military career
- Allegiance: United Kingdom
- Branch: British Army
- Service years: 1956–1990
- Rank: Major-General
- Commands: British Forces Cyprus; Royal Brunei Armed Forces; Royal Hussars
- Awards: Companion of the Order of the Bath; Commander of the Order of the British Empire

Major-General John Peter William Friedberger, CB, CBE (born 27 May 1937) is a former British Army officer who served as Commander British Forces Cyprus.

== Military career ==
Educated at Red House School in York and Wellington College, Friedberger was commissioned into the 10th Royal Hussars in 1956. He became commanding officer of the Royal Hussars in 1975, Commander of the Royal Brunei Armed Forces in 1982 and Assistant Chief of Staff at Northern Army Group in 1986. He went on to be Commander British Forces Cyprus and Administrator of the Sovereign Base Areas in 1988 before retiring in 1990.

In retirement Friedberger became Chairman of the British Helicopter Advisory Board.

Military offices
Preceded by Kenneth Hayr	Commander British Forces Cyprus; 1988–1990	Succeeded by Sandy Hunter
