= William Charles Forrest =

General William Charles Forrest CB
- Born: 22 March 1819; London, England
- Died: 1 April 1902 (aged 83); Winchester, Hampshire
- Military career
- Allegiance: United Kingdom
- Branch: British Army
- Rank: General
- Conflicts: Crimean War
- Awards: CB

General William Charles Forrest CB (22 March 1819 – 1 April 1902) was a senior officer in the British Army.

Forrest was born in London, the second son of Lieutenant-Colonel William Forrest of the Bengal Army, and his wife, Georgiana Christina Carmichael-Smyth, daughter of James Carmichael Smyth and sister of Sir James Carmichael-Smyth, 1st Baronet. He joined the Army as a cornet in 1836, and was promoted lieutenant in 1839, captain in 1841, major in 48, brevet lieutenant-colonel in 1854, lieutenant-colonel in 1859, colonel in 1860, major-general in 1868, lieutenant-general in 1877 and full general on 1 July 1881. He fought in the Crimean War and took part in the Charge of the Heavy Brigade at Balaclava. He was appointed CB in the 1875 Birthday Honours.

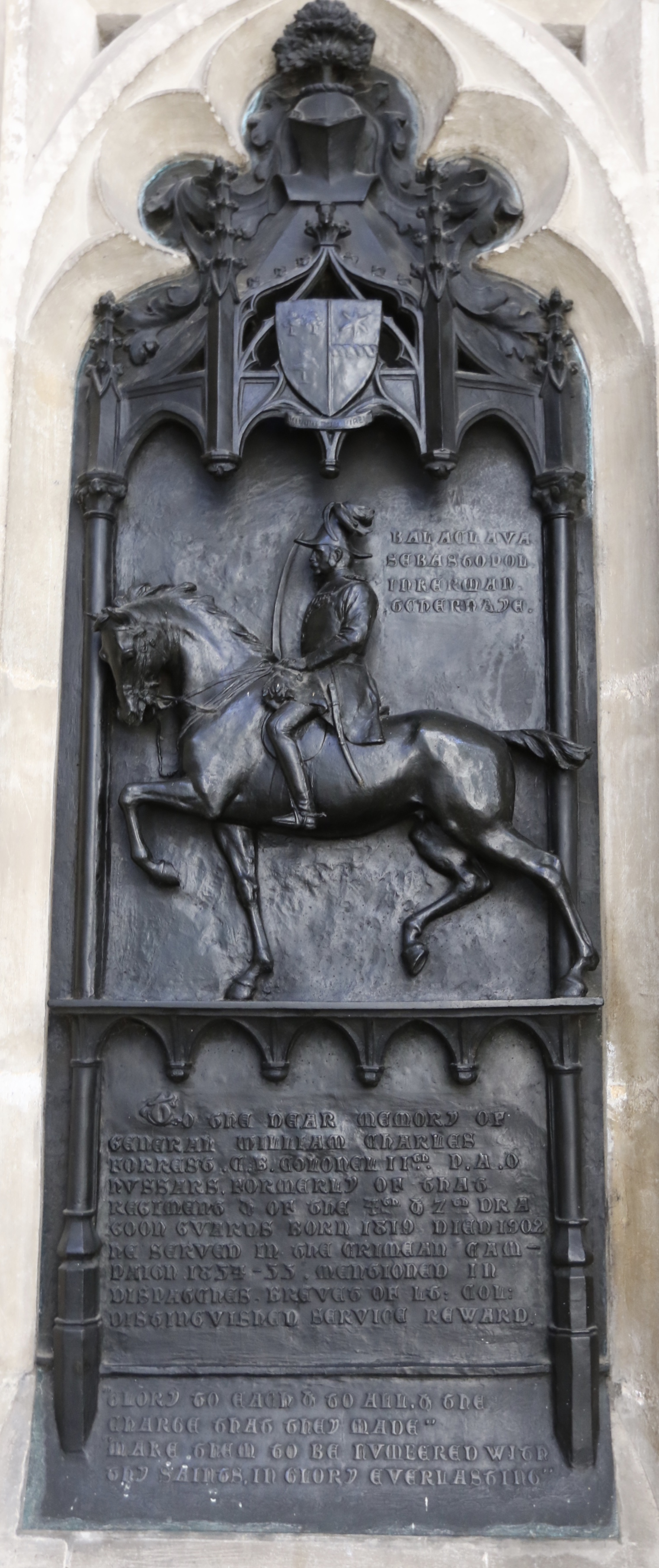
Memorial to General Forrest in Winchester Cathedral

He was given the colonelcy of the 8th Hussars from 1880 to 1886 and of the 11th Hussars from 8 February 1886 until his death in 1902.

His memorial in Winchester Cathedral confirms that he fought in the Crimean War and was present at the battles of Balaclava, Sebastopol, Inkerman and Chernaya. It also indicates that he was in the 11th Hussars and the 4th and 7th Dragoon Guards.

He married Elizabeth Ann Penfold in 1851. She died in 1887 and was buried at Loose parish church, Kent.

Military offices
Preceded by William Neville Custance	Colonel of the 11th Hussars; 1886–1902	Succeeded by Sir Arthur Lyttelton-Annesley
Preceded by Rudolph de Salis	Colonel of the 8th Hussars; 1880–1886	Succeeded by James Sayer
