= William Lithgow (cricketer) =

English cricketer

Personal information
- Full name: William Samuel Plenderleath Lithgow
- Born: 18 February 1920; Westminster, London, England
- Died: 8 August 1997 (aged 77); South Newington, Oxfordshire, England
- Batting: Right-handed
- Bowling: Right-arm off break

Domestic team information
- Years: Team
- 1937–1949: Oxfordshire
- 1939: Oxford University

Career statistics
| Competition | First-class |
|---|---|
| Matches | 3 |
| Runs scored | 69 |
| Batting average | 17.25 |
| 100s/50s | –/– |
| Top score | 27 |
| Catches/stumpings | 2/– |
- Source: Cricinfo, 24 June 2019

William Samuel Plenderleath Lithgow (18 February 1920 – 8 August 1997) was an English first-class cricketer. Lithgow played first-class cricket before the Second World War for Oxford University. After the war he embarked on a career as a professional soldier, serving in both the Royal Artillery and the 10th Royal Hussars until 1968. He later served as a bodyguard to Elizabeth II in the Honourable Corps of Gentlemen at Arms from 1970 to 1990.

== Early life and first-class cricket ==
The son of Captain Douglas Plenderleath Lithgow and his wife, Dorothy Kathleen Hughes-Onslow, he was born at Westminster in February 1920. He was educated at Harrow School, before going up to Christ Church, Oxford. While studying at Oxford, he made three appearances in first-class cricket for Oxford University in 1939, playing against the Free Foresters, the Minor Counties cricket team and Surrey. He scored 69 runs in these matches, with a high score of 27. In addition to playing first-class cricket, Lithgow also appeared in minor counties cricket for Oxfordshire, making eight appearances in Minor Counties Championship between 1937 and 1939.

== Military career and later life ==
He was a second lieutenant in the Oxford University contingent of the Officers' Training Corps. Having served in the Second World War, he was promoted to the rank of lieutenant in July 1974, with promotion to captain coming in August of the same year, at which point he was serving with the Royal Artillery. He married in May 1947, with the couple having three children. He concluded his minor counties career with Oxfordshire in 1948 and 1949, making three final appearances in the Minor Counties Championship. He was promoted to the rank of major in February 1954. Having been transferred to the 10th Royal Hussars at some point prior to 1961, he was placed on the Reserve of Officers list in 1961, before returning to the establishment in April 1965. He had been promoted to the rank of lieutenant colonel in April 1962.

Having retired from active service in February 1968, Lithgow was appointed by Elizabeth II to the Honourable Corps of Gentlemen at Arms in May 1970. He retired from his bodyguard duties with the Honourable Corps in February 1990. He served as the chairman of selectors of the British Olympic equestrian team. He died in August 1997 at South Newington, Oxfordshire.
