= Henry William Engleheart =

Recipient of the Victoria Cross

Henry William Engleheart VC
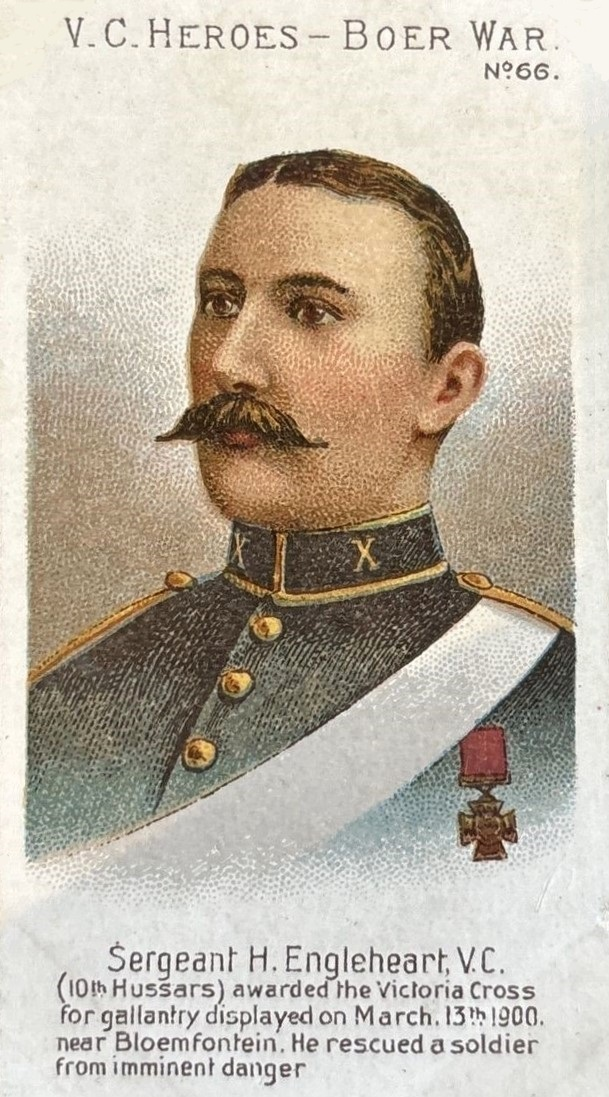
- Engleheart depicted on a cigarette card
- Born: 14 November 1863; Blackheath, London
- Died: 9 August 1939 (aged 75); Datchet, Berkshire
- Burial place: Woking Crematorium
- Military career
- Allegiance: United Kingdom
- Branch: British Army
- Rank: Quartermaster Sergeant
- Units: 10th Royal Hussars
- Conflicts: Second Boer War
- Awards: Victoria Cross

Henry William Engleheart VC (14 November 1863 – 9 August 1939) was an English recipient of the Victoria Cross, the highest and most prestigious award for gallantry in the face of the enemy that can be awarded to British and Commonwealth forces.

== Details ==
Engleheart was 36 years old, and a sergeant in the 10th Royal Hussars (Prince of Wales's Own), British Army during the Second Boer War when the following deed took place for which he was awarded the VC:

At dawn on the 13th March, 1900, the party that had destroyed the railway north of Bloemfontein had to charge through a Boer piquet and get over four deep spruits, in order to make their way back through the Boer lines. At the fourth spruit Sapper Webb's horse failed to get up the bank and he was left in a very dangerous position. In face of a very heavy rifle and shell fire, and, notwithstanding the great chance of being cut off, Sergeant Engleheart returned to Sapper Webb's assistance. It took some time to get the man and his horse out of the sluit and the position became momentarily more critical owing to the advance of the Boers. He was, however, at last successful, and, retiring slowly, to cover Webb's retreat, was able to get him safely back to the party. Shortly before this, Sergeant Engleheart had shown great gallantry in dashing into the first spruit, which could only be reached in single file and was still full of Boers hesitating whether to fly or fire. Had they been given time to rally, they must have destroyed the small party of British, as they outnumbered them by 4 to 1.

== Further information ==
Englehart was educated at Queen Elizabeth's Grammar School, Barnet.

He later achieved the rank of Quartermaster Sergeant. After leaving the army, he became Royal lodgekeeper at Windsor Castle, retiring six years before his death. Englehart died on 9 August 1939 at Datchet, Berkshire, and was cremated at Woking Crematorium.

== The medal ==
He was among the last group of five soldiers who received the Victoria Cross, from Queen Victoria before her death.

In 1977 his twin sons followed their late father's wish and donated Engleheart's medals to the 10th Hussars regimental museum. They are now displayed at The King's Royal Hussars Museum in Winchester.
