= Archibald Fraser Home =

Brigadier-General Sir Archibald Fraser Home KCVO CB CMG DSO
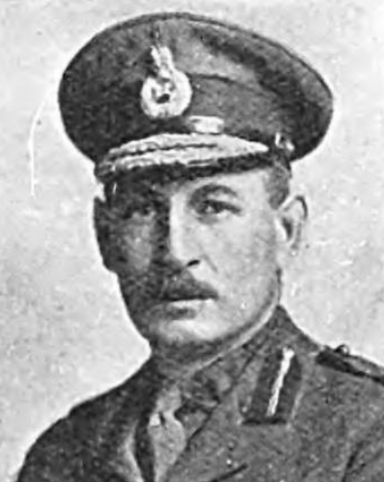
- Born: 14 September 1874; Kasanti, India
- Died: 20 January 1953 (aged 78); London
- Education: Aldenham School
- Spouse: Violet D'Arcy (m. 1900)
- Military career
- Allegiance: United Kingdom
- Branch: British Army
- Service years: 1896–1919
- Rank: Brigadier-general
- Units: 11th Hussars; Honourable Corps of Gentlemen at Arms
- Conflicts: First World War
- Awards: Mentioned in dispatches x 6 Legion of Honour (France)

Brigadier-General Sir Archibald Fraser Home KCVO CB CMG DSO (14 September 1874 – 1953) was a British Army officer most noted for his service during the First World War and in The Corps of Gentlemen-at-Arms.

Home entered the army in 1895. His diaries record his service on the Western Front as a general staff officer (Grade 11) and then 1 in the 1st Cavalry Division (August 1914 – August 1915), as brigadier general, general staff of the Cavalry Corps (August 1915 – March 1916), as general staff officer (Grade 1) in the 46th (North Midland) Division (April June 1916), as BGGS IX Corps (June – September 1916) and as BGGS Cavalry Corps (September 1916 – November 1918).

Home was appointed to The Corps of Gentlemen-at-Arms in 1919, and served as Clerk of the Cheque & Adjutant, 1926–35; as Lieutenant, 1938–45; and as Standard Bearer, 1935–38.

Home, retired from the army in May 1919 with the honorary rank of brigadier general, was appointed a justice of the peace and High sheriff for Suffolk in 1929. He was colonel of the regiment of the 11th Hussars (Prince Albert's Own) (1921) between 1939 and 1945.

His service was recognised by the following orders, decorations and medals: Companion of the Order of The Bath [C.B. cr. 1919]; Companion of the Order of St. Michael & St. George [C.M.G. cr. 1918]; Commander of the Legion of Honour [cr. 6 November 1916]; The Distinguished Service Order [London Gazette, 18 February 1915]; 1914 star; British War medal 1914–20; Allied Victory medal 1914–19, with oak leaf; Coronation medal, 1902.

== Family ==
Born in India, Archibald Fraser Home was the son of Frederick Jervis Home and Constance Stanley McGowan. He married Violet May Bertha D'Arcy in 1900, and had three children, a son and two daughters.
