= Thomas Henry Mason =

Royal Navy Admiral (1811–1900)

Admiral Thomas Henry Mason CB
- Born: 1811
- Died: 20 February 1900 (aged 88–89); Ipswich
- Military career
- Allegiance: United Kingdom
- Branch: Royal Navy
- Service years: 1822–1880s
- Rank: Admiral
- Awards: Order of the Bath

Admiral Thomas Henry Mason, CB (1811 – 20 February 1900) was a Royal Navy officer who was in command of a ship during the Battle of Canton in 1857.

== Early life ==
Mason was born in 1811, the son of Rev. Thomas Mason, of Culpho.

== Career ==
He entered the Royal Navy in 1822, was promoted to lieutenant in 1837 and to commander in 1841. Appointed in command of the screw gunboat HMS Algerine on its commission in February 1857, he was present during the operations and battle of Canton in December the same year, taking part in the capture of that city and of Amoy. He received the Second China War Medal for his services.

He was promoted to captain in 1849, to rear-admiral on 2 April 1866, to vice-admiral in 1873, and finally to admiral in 1878. In 1875, he had been appointed a Companion of the Order of the Bath (CB).

From 1894 he received a Greenwich Hospital pension.

== Death ==
He died at his residence Algerine-cottage, Ipswich on 20 February 1900.
