= 11th Hussars =

Cavalry regiment of the British Army from 1715 to 1969

11th Hussars (Prince Albert's Own)
- Badge of the 11th Hussars
- Active: 1715–1969
- Country: Kingdom of Great Britain (1715–1800); United Kingdom (1801–1969)
- Branch: British Army
- Type: Cavalry
- Role: Line cavalry
- Size: Regiment
- Nicknames: The Cherry Pickers, The Cherrybums, from which the more genteel Cherubims
- Mottos: Treu und Fest (Loyal and Sure)
- Anniversaries: Balaclava (25 October)

Commanders
- Notable commanders: James Brudenell, 7th Earl of Cardigan

The 11th Hussars (Prince Albert's Own) was a cavalry regiment of the British Army established in 1715. It saw service for three centuries including the First World War and Second World War but then amalgamated with the 10th Royal Hussars (Prince of Wales' Own) to form the Royal Hussars in 1969.

== History ==
=== Formation to end 18th century ===
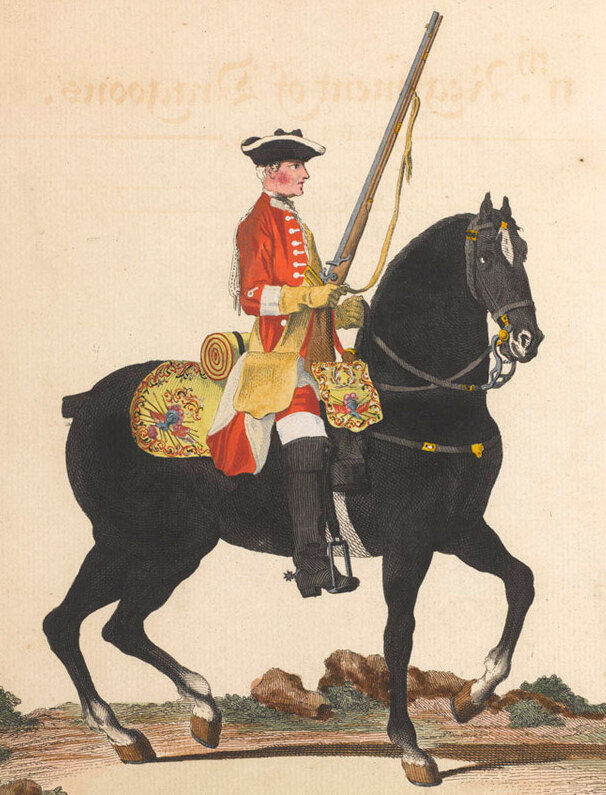
c. 1742 engraving of a regimental private

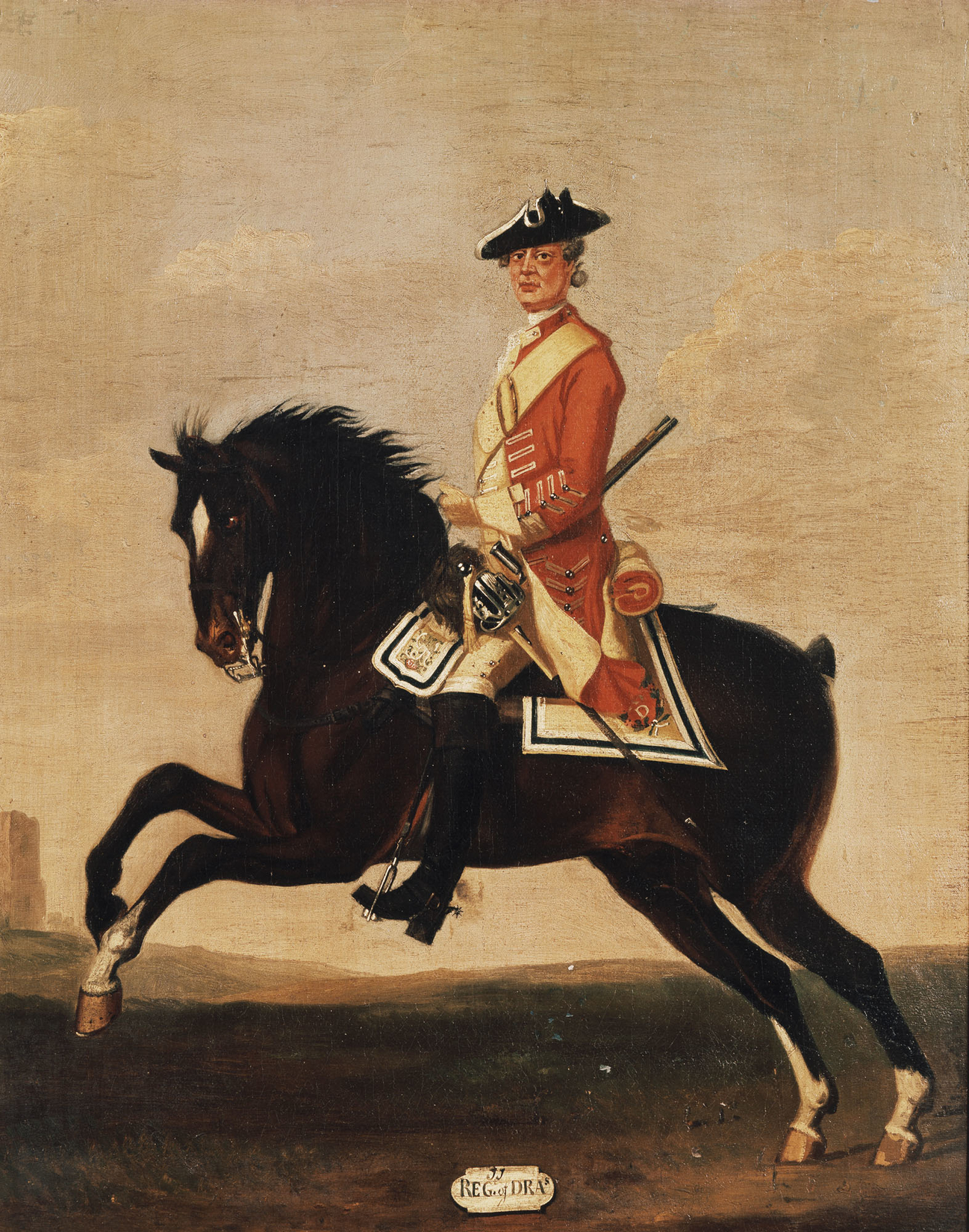
c. 1751 painting of a regimental private

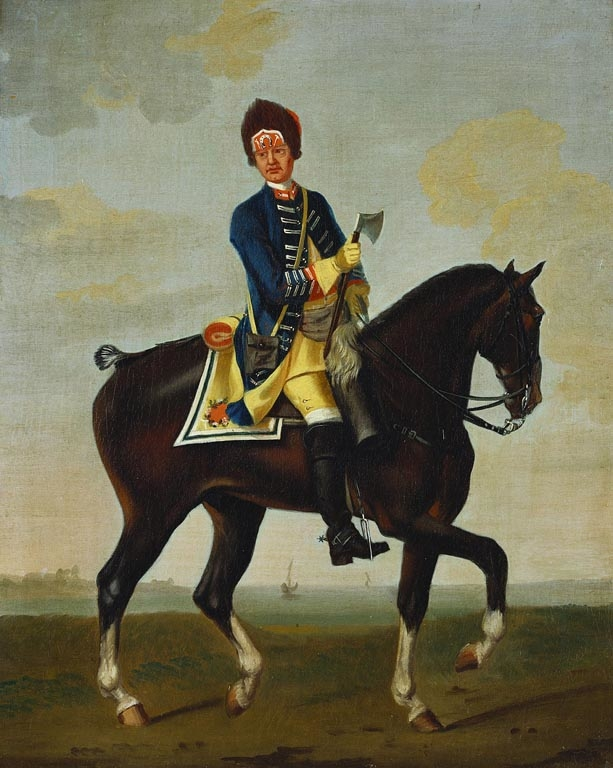
c. 1751 painting of a regimental farrier

The regiment was formed at Colchester in July 1715 by Philip Honeywood as Honeywood's Regiment of Dragoons, one of 16 raised in response to the 1715 Jacobite rising. It fought in the Battle of Preston that ended the revolt in England and while many of these formations were disbanded in 1718, Honeywood's remained in being.

During the Jacobite rising of 1745, the regiment took part in the December 1745 Clifton Moor Skirmish, allegedly the last military engagement on English soil, as well as Battle of Culloden in April 1746, often cited as the last pitched battle on British soil. After 1751, regiments were numbered, rather than being named after the current Colonel, and it became the 11th Regiment of Dragoons.

When the Seven Years' War broke out in 1756, the regiment took part in the 1758 raids on St Malo and Cherbourg. Attempting to divert French forces from Hanover, they failed to achieve this aim and the regiment was shipped to Germany in May 1760 as part of the Marquess of Granby's cavalry corps, winning its first battle honour in July at Warburg. It was also present in the Allied victory at Villinghausen in July 1761, which forced the French onto the defensive and ultimately led to the Treaty of Paris in 1763.

In 1755, each dragoon regiment added a reconnaissance or 'light' troop; in February 1779, these were detached, that from the 11th helping form the 19th Light Dragoons, which in 1862 became the 19th Royal Hussars. While dragoons had previously been mounted infantry, as part of a tactical rethink, the 11th was re-designated in 1783 as 'light cavalry' and became the 11th Regiment of Light Dragoons.

During the French Revolutionary Wars, two squadrons of the 11th Light Dragoons took part in the Duke of York's Low Countries campaign in 1793-95, including the action at Famars and the sieges of Valenciennes and Landrecies. It was also involved in the Anglo-Russian invasion of Holland, including the October 1799 battles of Alkmaar and Castricum.

=== 19th century ===
With the exception of a short spell in Egypt during the victorious campaign of 1801, the regiment did not see active service again until it was sent to Portugal in April 1811, where it joined the Peninsular War campaign. In August, a ten-man piquet was surprised and captured at San Martín de Trevejo in Spain, an incident that may have given rise to the regiment's nickname, The Cherry Pickers, which tradition associates with a mishap occurring in the vicinity of a cherry orchard. It fought at Badajoz in April 1812 and the Battle of Salamanca in July 1812 before returning to Britain. During the campaign of 1815, it arrived at Ostend as part of Vandeleur's brigade, and went on to fight at Quatre Bras and Waterloo.

In 1819, the regiment moved to India, where it remained until 1836. It was deployed at the Siege of Bharatpur between 1825 and 1826. Shortly before returning to Britain, the Earl of Cardigan became lieutenant-colonel; embarked on a series of changes, which were intended to increase regimental prestige but resulted in a number of highly publicised disputes, including the so-called 'Black Bottle' affair.

In 1840, the 11th Light Dragoons served as escort to Prince Albert on his arrival in England to marry Queen Victoria. She appointed Prince Albert colonel of the regiment. and granted them the title 11th (Prince Albert's Own) Hussars. Prince Albert's interests included military tactics and equipment and he helped design the regiment's new uniforms.

The regiment served in the Crimean War, as part of the Light Brigade commanded by Cardigan, now a Major General and fought at the Battle of Alma in September 1854. It was also involved in the Charge of the Light Brigade in October 1854; due to miscommunication, Cardigan led the brigade against unbroken and more numerous Russian forces and while able to withdraw to its starting position, it suffered heavy losses as a result.

The 11th lost three officers and 55 men in the debacle, while Lieutenant Dunn was awarded the Victoria Cross for rescuing two members of his troop. Edward Woodham of the 11th Hussars later acted as chairman of the organising committee for the 21st Anniversary dinner held at Alexandra Palace for survivors of the Charge. The regiment was renamed the 11th (or Prince Albert's Own) Hussars in 1861. A detachment took part in the 1884 Nile Expedition and during the Second Boer War, it participated in the February 1900 Relief of Ladysmith.

In 1911 Prince Albert's great-grandson Crown Prince Wilhelm of Prussia became colonel-in-chief of the regiment. He was removed in October 1914 following the outbreak of the First World War.

=== The First World War ===
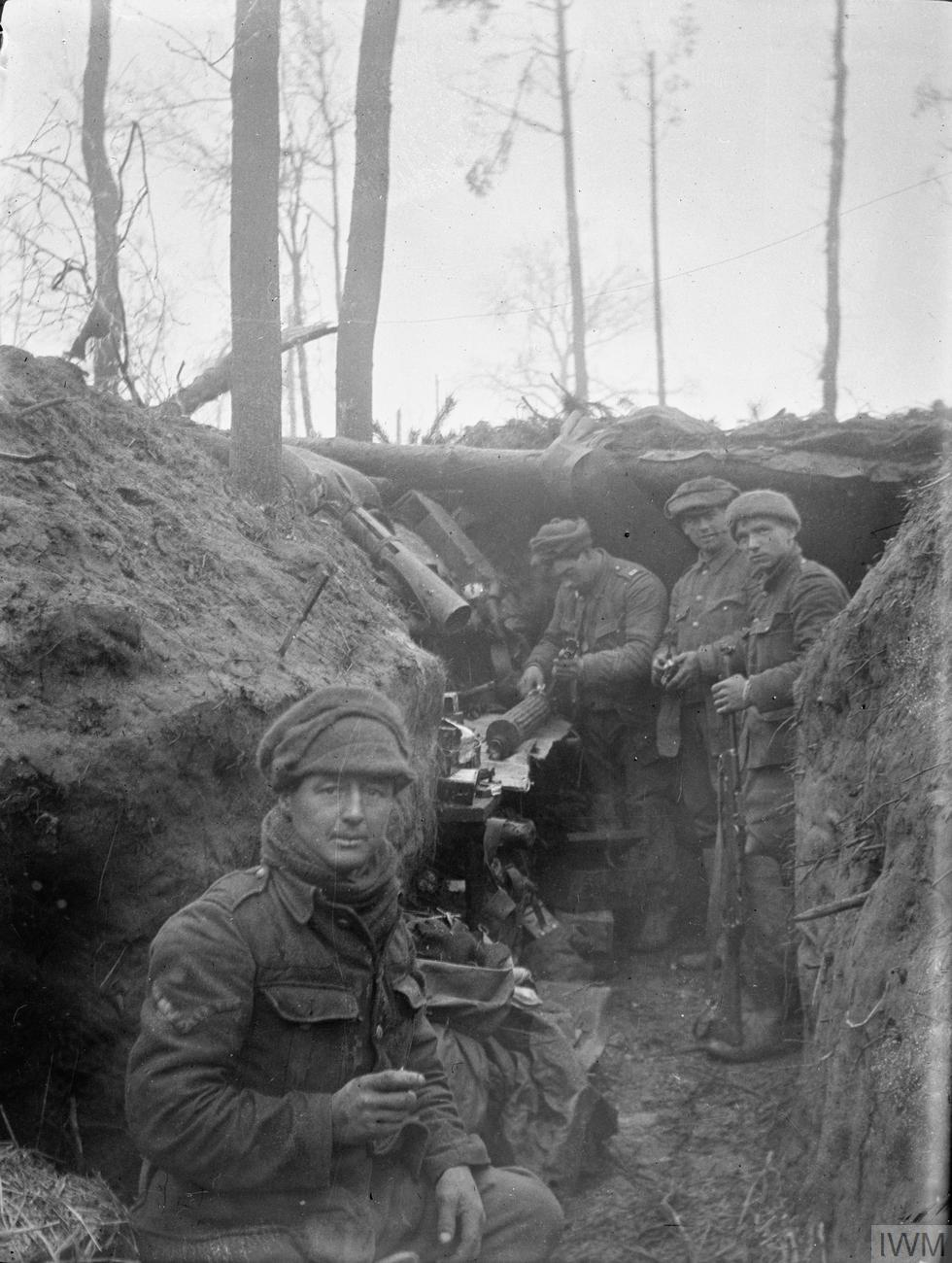
11th Hussars machine gun section, Zillebeke winter 1914–1915

The regiment landed in France as part of the 1st Cavalry Brigade in the 1st Cavalry Division in August 1914 for service on the Western Front with the British Expeditionary Force. The regiment took part in the Great Retreat and the regiment, working with the 2nd Dragoon Guards, conducted a cavalry charge which led to the capture of eight guns at Néry in September 1914. In an action during the Battle of Messines in October 1914 a squadron from the regiment endured a heavy German bombardment that left many of its soldiers buried in a trench while another squadron from the regiment used a vantage point at the top of a building to train a machine gun on the Germans. At the Second Battle of Ypres in April 1915 the regiment, working with the Durham Light Infantry and 9th Lancers, held the village of Hooge despite being under attack from the German forces using poison gas. In spring 1918 the commanding officer of the regiment Colonel Rowland Anderson led a bayonet assault at Sailly-Laurette which, taking the Germans by surprise, led to them being completely repulsed.

=== The inter-war years ===
The regiment was renamed the 11th Hussars (Prince Albert's Own) in 1921; it became the first British cavalry regiment to become mechanized in 1928 and it became involved in suppressing the Arab revolt in Palestine in 1936.

=== The Second World War ===
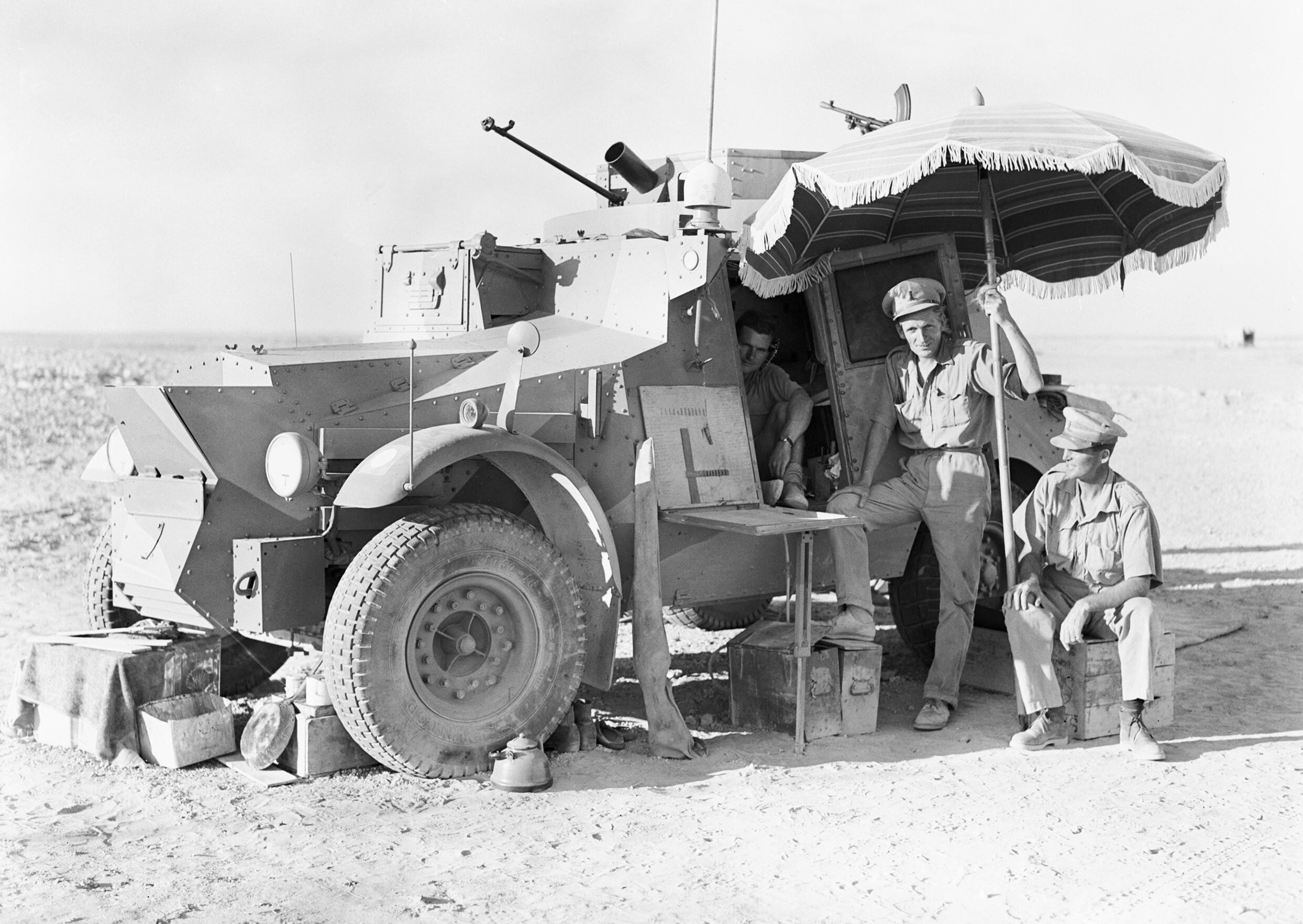
Men of the 11th Hussars with their Morris CS9 armoured car, taking a halt while on patrol near the Libyan frontier, Egypt, July 1940

The regiment, which had been located in Egypt when the war started, deployed as part of the divisional troops of the 7th Armoured Division and conducted raids on Italian positions in Italian Libya using armoured cars during the Western Desert Campaign. It captured Fort Capuzzo in June 1940 and, in an ambush east of Bardia, captured General Lastucci, the Engineer-in-Chief of the Italian Tenth Army.

Following the Italian invasion of Egypt in September 1940, the regiment took part in the British counterattack called Operation Compass, launched against Italian forces first in Egypt, then Libya. It was part of an ad hoc combat unit called Combeforce, commanded by Lieutenant-Colonel John Combe, that cut the retreating Tenth Army off and led to their surrender at the Battle of Beda Fomm in February 1941. The regiment fought at the Second Battle of El Alamein in October 1942. The regiment took part in the Allied invasion of Italy in September 1943 and, after the Normandy landings in June 1944, took part in the North-West Europe Campaign.

=== Post-war ===
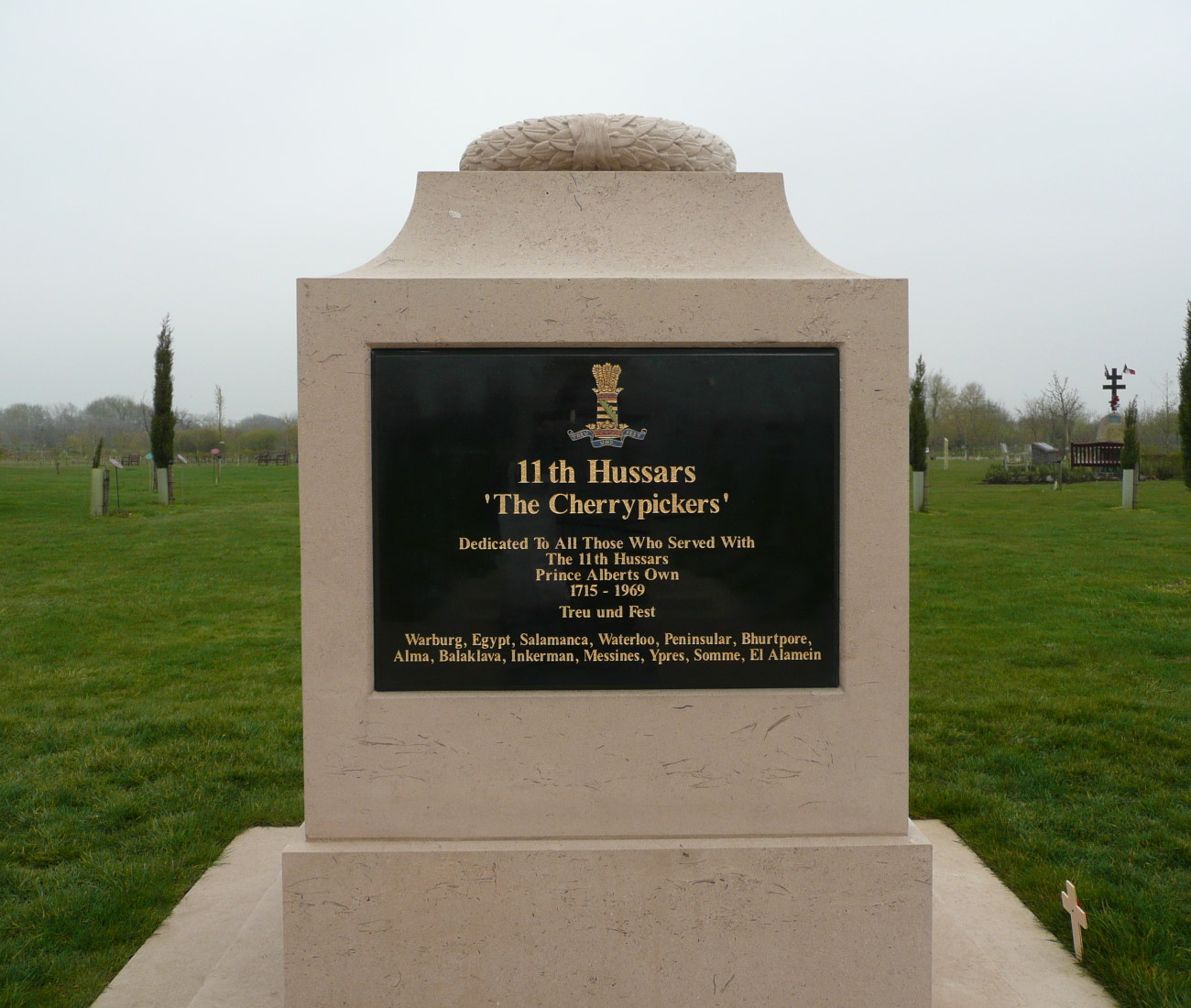
11th Hussars monument at the National Memorial Arboretum

The regiment was posted to Wavell Barracks in Berlin in 1945 and, after tours at various locations in Lower Saxony including Jever, Delmenhorst, Osnabrück and Wesendorf, it returned home in March 1953. It deployed to Johor Bahru in Malaya in July 1953 during the Malayan Emergency. After returning home, it moved to Hadrian's Camp in Carlisle as an Armoured Basic Training Unit in August 1956, then to Lisanelly Barracks in Omagh back into the armoured reconnaissance role in August 1959, and then deployed to Aden in November 1960 shortly before the Aden Emergency. It returned to England in November 1961 and then moved to Haig Barracks in Hohne in October 1962 where, after becoming the first regiment to use Chieftain tanks in regular service in 1967, it remained until returning home again in January 1969. The regiment was amalgamated with the 10th Royal Hussars (Prince of Wales's Own), to form the Royal Hussars on 25 October 1969.

== Regimental museum ==
The regimental collection is held by HorsePower: The Museum of the King's Royal Hussars which is based at Peninsula Barracks in Winchester.

== Notable members ==
- James Brudenell, 7th Earl of Cardigan — leader of the Charge of the Light Brigade
- Alexander Roberts Dunn — the first Canadian to win the Victoria Cross, for rescuing two soldiers during the Charge of the Light Brigade
- Tim Forster — Racehorse trainer of 3 Grand National winners
- John Ashley Kilvert — survivor of the Charge of the Light Brigade and later mayor of Wednesbury
- David Margesson, 1st Viscount Margesson — British politician
- Francis Newall, 2nd Baron Newall — British politician
- William Henry Pennington — survivor of the Charge of the Light Brigade and later a Shakespearean actor
- Nicholas Soames — British politician
- Prince Michael of Kent
- Sir Philip Frankland-Payne-Gallwey, 6th Baronet
- Harry Flashman — fictional anti-hero
- Antony Beevor — writer
- John Frederick Boyce Combe — World War II leader of Combe Force
- Ted Dexter — England international cricketer and administrator

== Battle honours ==
The battle honours of the regiment were as follows:

- Early wars: Warburg, Beaumont, Willems, Egypt, Salamanca, Peninsula, Waterloo, Bhurtpore, Alma, Balaklava, Inkerman, Sevastopol
- The Great War: Mons, Le Cateau, Retreat from Mons, Marne 1914, Aisne 1914, Messines 1914, Armentières 1914, Ypres 1914 '15, Frezenberg, Bellewaarde, Somme 1916 '18, Flers-Courcelette, Arras 1917, Scarpe 1917, Cambrai 1917 '18, St. Quentin, Rosières, Amiens, Albert 1918, Hindenburg Line, St. Quentin Canal, Beaurevoir, Selle, France and Flanders 1914–18
- The Second World War: Egyptian Frontier 1940, Withdrawal to Matruh, Bir Emba, Sidi Barrani, Buq Buq, Bardia 1941, Capture of Tobruk, Beda Fomm, Halfaya 1941, Sidi Suleiman, Tobruk 1941, Gubi I II, Gabr Saleh, Sidi Rezegh 1941, Taieb el Essem, Relief of Tobruk, Saunnu, Msus, Defence of Alamein Line, Alam el Halfa, El Alamein, Advance on Tripoli, Enfidaville, Tunis, North Africa 1940–43, Capture of Naples, Volturno Crossing, Italy 1943, Villers Bocage, Bourguébus Ridge, Mont Pinçon, Jurques, Dives Crossing, La Vie Crossing, Lisieux, Le Touques Crossing, Risle Crossing, Roer, Rhine, Ibbenburen, Aller, North-West Europe 1944–45

== Commanding Officers ==
The Commanding Officers have been:

- 1958–1961: Lt.-Col. J. Anthony N. Crankshaw
- 1961–1963: Lt.-Col. Philip D.S. Lauder
- 1963–1965: Lt.-Col. Richard D. Sutton
- 1965–1966: Lt.-Col. Thomas A. Hall
- 1966–1968: Lt.-Col. Peter M. Hamer
- 1968–1969: Lt.-Col. Clive H. Robertson

== Colonels—with other names for the regiment ==
The colonels of the regiment were as follows (the Kerr family provided the colonels for two-thirds of the regiment's first century):

- 1715 Philip Honywood —Honywood's or Honeywood's Regiment of Dragoons
- 1732 Lord Mark Kerr — Kerr's Regiment of Dragoons

11th Regiment of Dragoons (1751)

A royal warrant provided that in future regiments would not be known by their colonels' names, but by their "number or rank" on 1 July 1751

- 1752 William, Marquess of Lothian
- 1775 James Johnston

11th Regiment of Light Dragoons (1783)

- 1785 Thomas Gage
- 1787 Joseph, Lord Dover KB
- 1789 Studholme Hodgson
- 1798 William, Marquess of Lothian KT
- 1813 Lord William Bentinck GCB GCH
- 1839 Gen. Lord Charles Henry Somerset Manners, KCB
- 1839 Lt-Gen. Philip Philpot

11th (Prince Albert's Own) Hussars (1840)

- 1840 F.M. Francis Albert Augustus Charles Emmanuel, Duke of Saxony, Prince of Saxe-Coburg (The Prince Consort), KG, KT, KP, GCB, GCMG, KSI
- 1842 Gen. Sir Arthur Benjamin Clifton, GCB, KCH
- 1842 Gen. Charles Murray Cathcart, 2nd Earl Cathcart (Lord Greenock), GCB
- 1847 Gen. Sir Henry Wyndham, KCB
- 1860 Lt-Gen. James Thomas Brudenell, 7th Earl of Cardigan, KCB

11th (or Prince Albert's Own) Hussars (1861)

- 1868 Gen. George William Key
- 1871 Gen. Charles Hagart, CB
- 1873 Gen. Sir Archibald Little, GCB
- 1875 Gen. William Neville Custance, CB
- 1886 Gen. William Charles Forrest, CB
- 1902 Lt-Gen. Sir Arthur Lyttelton-Annesley, KCB, KCVO

11th Hussars (Prince Albert's Own) (1921)

- 1926 Maj-Gen. Thomas Tait Pitman, CB, CMG
- 1939 Brig-Gen. Sir Archibald Fraser Home, KCVO, CB, CMG, DSO
- 1945 Maj-Gen. John Frederick Boyce Combe, CB, DSO
- 1957 Col. Adam Trevor Smail, DSO
- 1965–1969 Col. Sir John Charles Arthur Digby Lawson, Bt, DSO, MC (to The Royal Hussars (Prince of Wales's Own)
- 1969 Regiment amalgamated with 10th Royal Hussars (Prince of Wales's Own) to form The Royal Hussars (Prince of Wales's Own)

== See also ==
- British cavalry during the First World War

== Sources ==
- Cannon, Richard (1843). Historical record of the Eleventh, or the Prince Albert's Own Regiment of Hussars: containing an account of the formation of the regiment in 1715 and of its subsequent services to 1842. John W. Parker. OCLC 1083478636.
- Macksey, Major Kenneth (1972) [1971]. Beda Fomm: The Classic Victory. Ballantine's Illustrated History of the Violent Century. SBN 345-09748-3. New York: Ballantine Books. OCLC 473687868.
- Playfair, Major-General I. S. O. (2004). The Mediterranean and Middle East: The Early Successes Against Italy (to May 1941). History of the Second World War, United Kingdom Military Series. I. Naval & Military Press. ISBN 1-84574-065-3.
- Reid, Stuart (1996). 1745, A Military History of the Last Jacobite Rising. Sarpedon. ISBN 978-1-885119-28-5.
