= Arthur Lyttelton-Annesley =

British Army general

Lieutenant-General Sir Arthur Lyttelton-Annesley KCB KCVO
- Born: 2 September 1837
- Died: 16 February 1926 (aged 88)
- Military career
- Allegiance: United Kingdom
- Branch: British Army
- Rank: Lieutenant-General
- Commands: Commander-in-Chief, Scotland; 11th Hussars
- Conflicts: Crimean War
- Awards: Knight Commander of the Order of the Bath; Knight Commander of the Royal Victorian Order

Lieutenant-General Sir Arthur Lyttelton-Annesley, KCB, KCVO (2 September 1837 – 16 February 1926) was a British Army officer who served as Commander-in-Chief, Scotland.

== Military career ==
Educated at Harrow School, Lyttelton-Annesley was commissioned into the 11th Hussars in July 1854. He took part in the Siege of Sebastopol in 1854 and the Battle of the Chernaya in August 1855 during the Crimean War. He went out to India in 1866 and then returned to England to take command of his regiment in 1877 before being appointed Assistant Adjutant-General of the Horse Guards in 1878 and then Adjutant-General of the Bombay Army in 1883. He went on to command the troops in the North British District in 1888, before retiring in 1893.

In 1896 Lyttelton-Annesley was given the colonelcy of the 12th (Prince of Wales's Royal) Lancers, transferring in 1902 to be colonel of the 11th Hussars until his death in 1926. He was invested as a Knight Commander of the Order of the Bath in the 1923 New Year Honours.

Military offices
Preceded by Alexander Elliot	Commanding the troops in the North British District; 1888–1893	Succeeded by Arthur Lyon Fremantle
Preceded by Robert Hale	Colonel of the 12th (Prince of Wales's Royal) Lancers; 1896–1902	Succeeded by John Cecil Russell
Preceded by William Charles Forrest	Colonel of the 11th Hussars; 1902–1926	Succeeded by Thomas Tait Pitman
