= 10th Royal Hussars =

British Army cavalry regiment

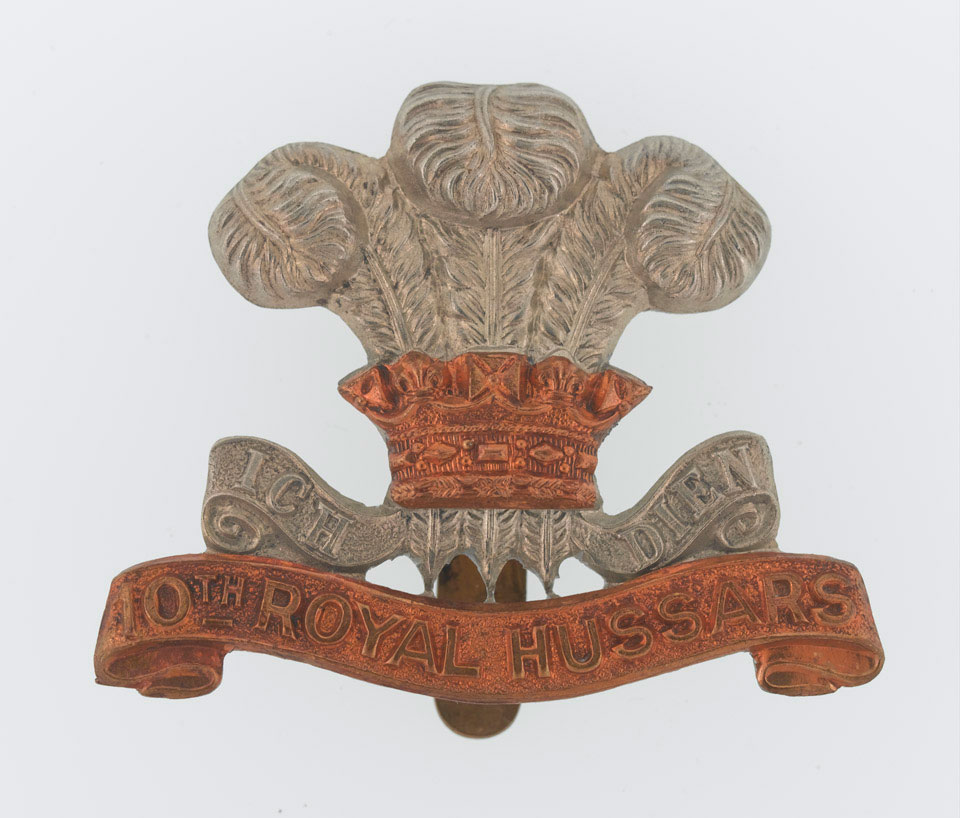
- c. 1896 regimental cap badge
- Active: 1715–1969
- Allegiance: Great Britain (1715–1800); United Kingdom (1801–1969)
- Branch: British Army
- Type: Cavalry
- Size: Regiment
- Nicknames: Baker's Light Bobs, The Chainy 10th, The Shiny 10th
- Motto: Ich Dien (I Serve)
- March: (Quick) The Merry Month Of May
- Anniversaries: El Alamein (23 Oct)

Commanders
- Notable commanders: John Vaughan; Reginald Barnes

The 10th Royal Hussars was a cavalry regiment of the British Army raised in 1715. It saw service for three centuries including in the First World War and Second World War before being amalgamated with the 11th Hussars to form the Royal Hussars in October 1969.

== History ==
=== Early history ===
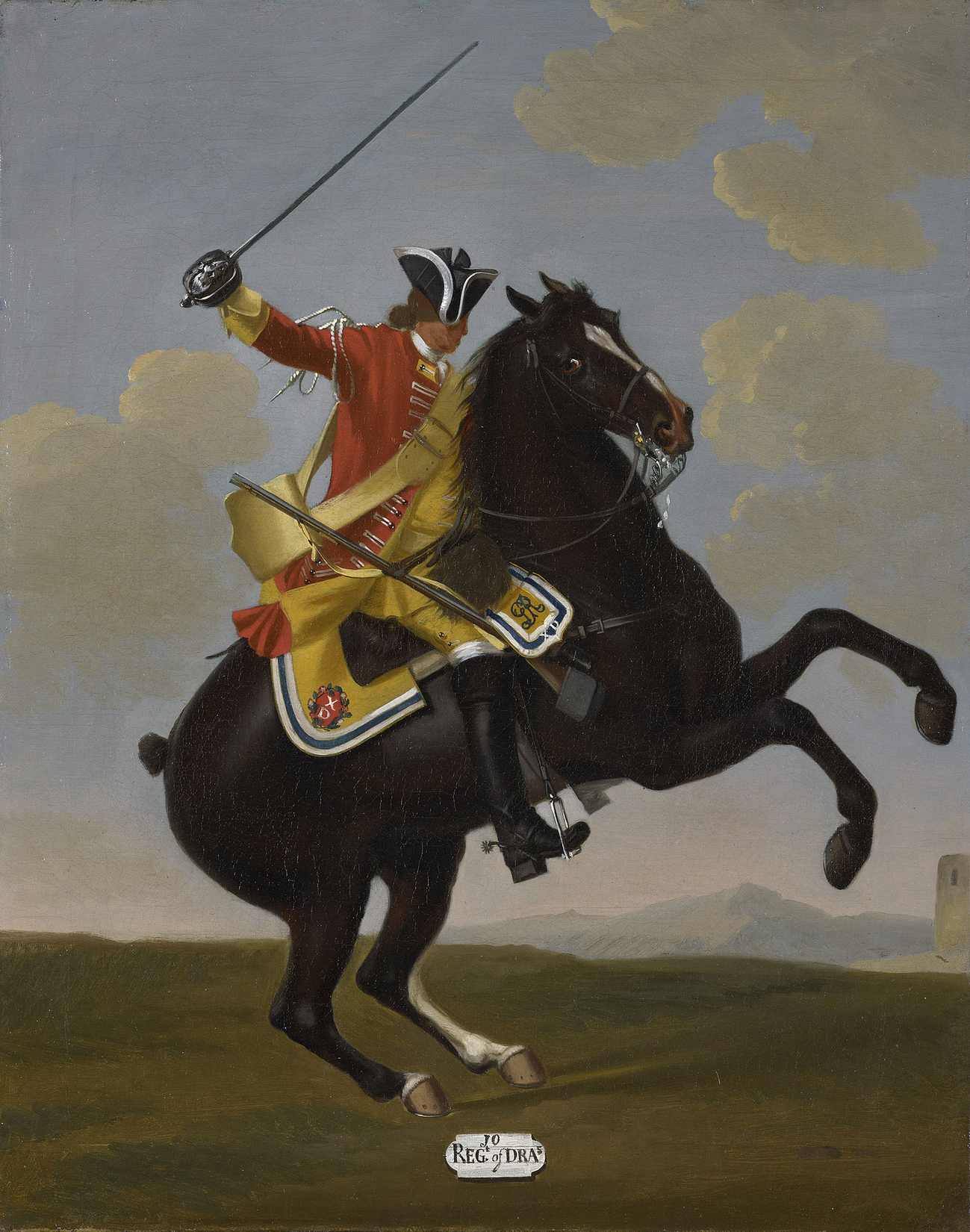
c. 1751 painting of a regimental private

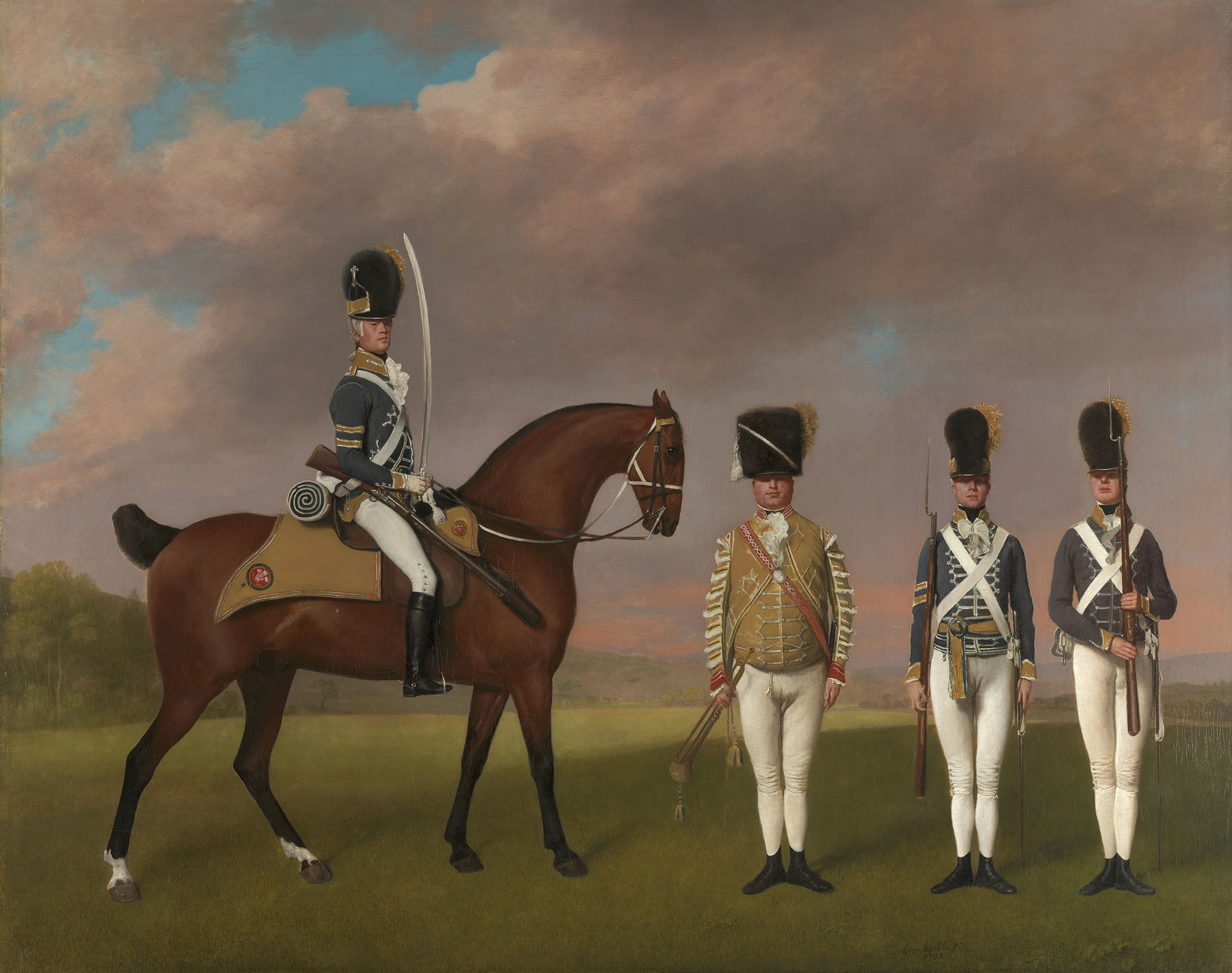
1793 painting of four regimental soldiers

The regiment was formed at Hertford in 1715 as Gore's Regiment of Dragoons, one of 16 raised in response to the 1715 Jacobite rising. The Rising ended before the unit was ready for action; while most of these temporary formations were disbanded in 1718, Gore's remained in being and spent the next 25 years on garrison duty, primarily in the West Country. It first saw active service during the 1745 rising, at the Battle of Falkirk Muir in January 1746 and the Battle of Culloden in April. As part of the reforms enacted by Prince William, Duke of Cumberland, it was retitled the 10th Regiment of Dragoons in 1751.

During the Seven Years' War, the regiment took part in the raid on St Malo in June 1758, followed by the Battle of Minden on 1 August 1759, and the Battle of Warburg on 13 July 1760. The regiment also fought at the Battle of Kloster Kampen on 15 October 1760, where the regiment's commanding officer Colonel William Augustus Pitt was badly wounded and taken prisoner. In July 1761 the regiment fought in the Battle of Villinghausen, which forced the French onto the defensive and ultimately contributed to the signing of the Treaty of Paris, which ended the war.

In 1779, the light troop was detached to form the 19th Regiment of (Light) Dragoons; in 1783, it became the 10th (Prince of Wales's Own) Regiment of (Light) Dragoons in honour of George, Prince of Wales. As a result of its connection with the Prince of Wales, the regiment became known for elaborate and expensive uniforms and the high personal income required to be an officer. In June 1794, Beau Brummell, an arbiter of men's fashion in Regency London, was given a commission as cornet but resigned in 1795 when it moved from London to Manchester.

=== Napoleonic Wars ===
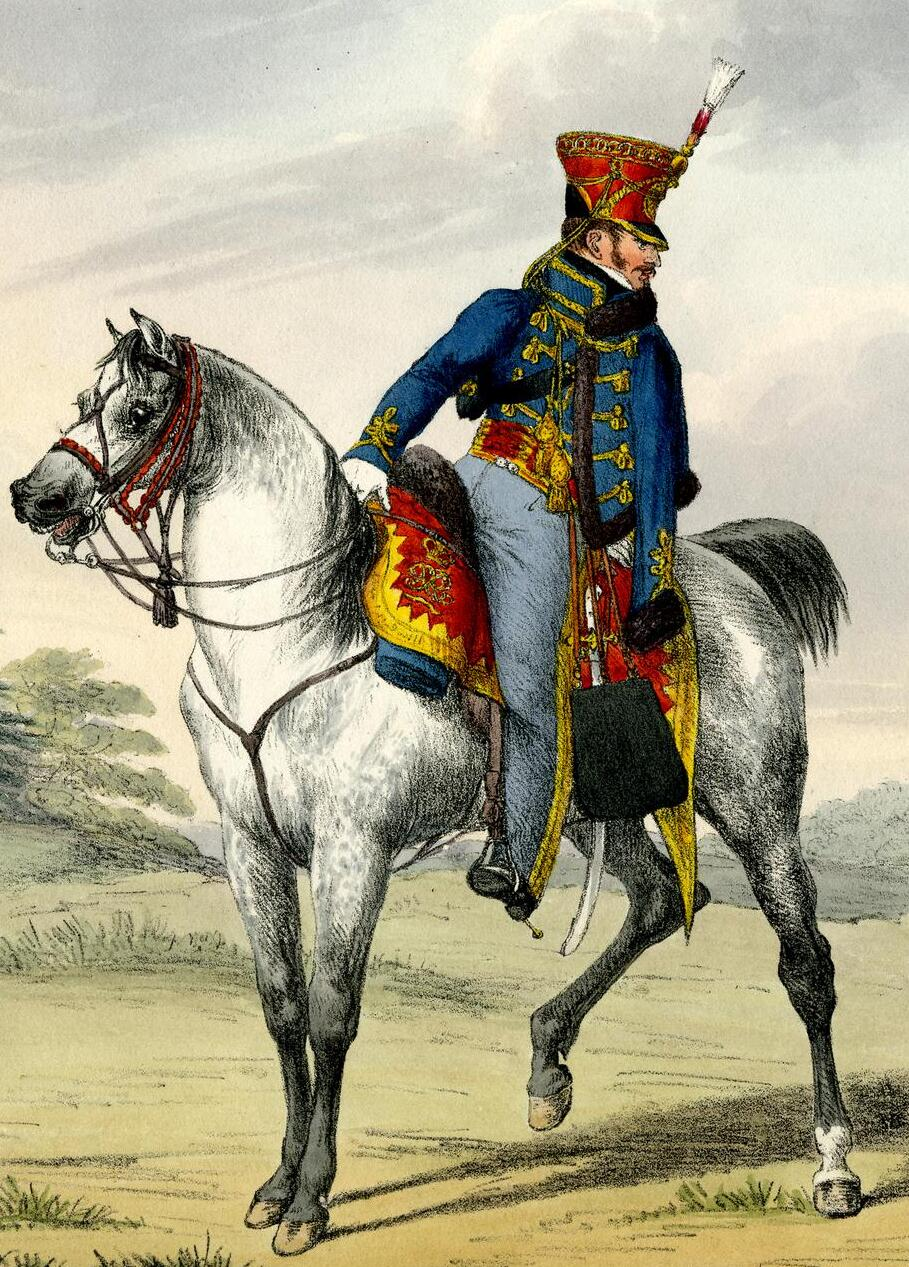
1819 illustration of a regimental officer

In 1806, the regiment was again re-designated, this time becoming a hussar regiment as the 10th (Prince of Wales's Own) Regiment of (Light) Dragoons (Hussars), and sailed for Corunna in Spain in November 1808. The regiment saw action at the Battle of Sahagún in December 1808 and the Battle of Benavente later in December 1808 during the Peninsular War. At Benavente the regiment captured General Charles Lefebvre-Desnouettes, the French cavalry commander. The regiment then took part in the Battle of Corunna in January 1809 before returning to England.

In 1813, having landed once more in Spain, the regiment fought at the Battle of Morales in June 1813. During the battle the regiment destroyed the 16th French Dragoons between Toro and Zamora, taking around 260 prisoners. The regiment also fought at the Battle of Vitoria later in the month while still in Spain and then, having advanced into France, fought at the Battle of Orthez in February 1814 and the Battle of Toulouse in April 1814. As part of the 6th Cavalry Brigade, the regiment charged the French cavalry and infantry at the Battle of Waterloo in June 1815.

=== Victorian era ===
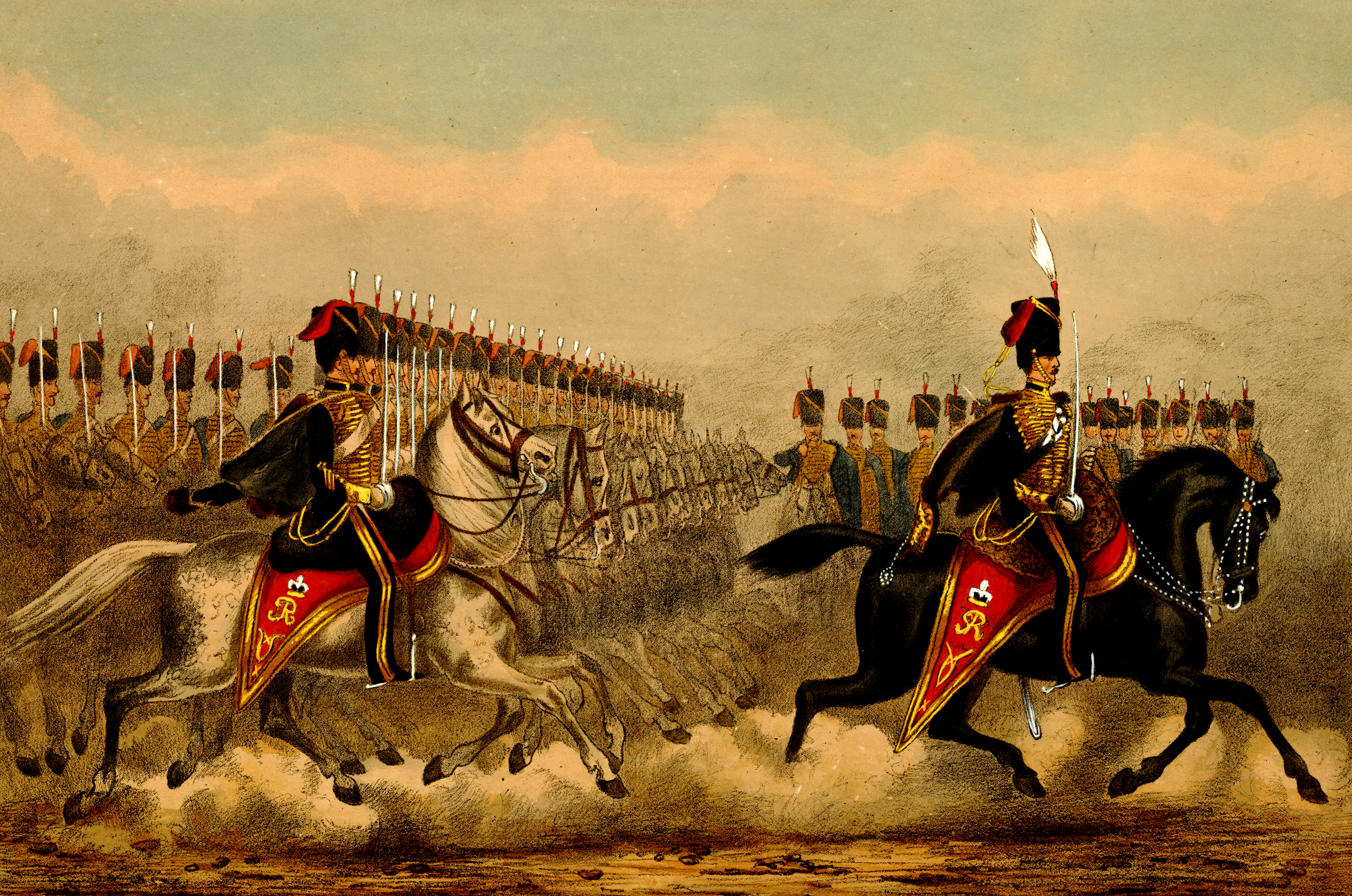
c. 1860 illustration of the regiment

The regiment was sent to India in 1846 and then saw action at the Siege of Sevastopol in winter 1854 and at the Battle of Eupatoria in February 1855 during the Crimean War. In 1861, it was renamed the 10th (The Prince of Wales's Own) Royal Hussars. The regiment saw action at the Battle of Ali Masjid in November 1878 during the Second Anglo-Afghan War and at the First and Second Battles of El Teb in February 1884 during the Mahdist War.

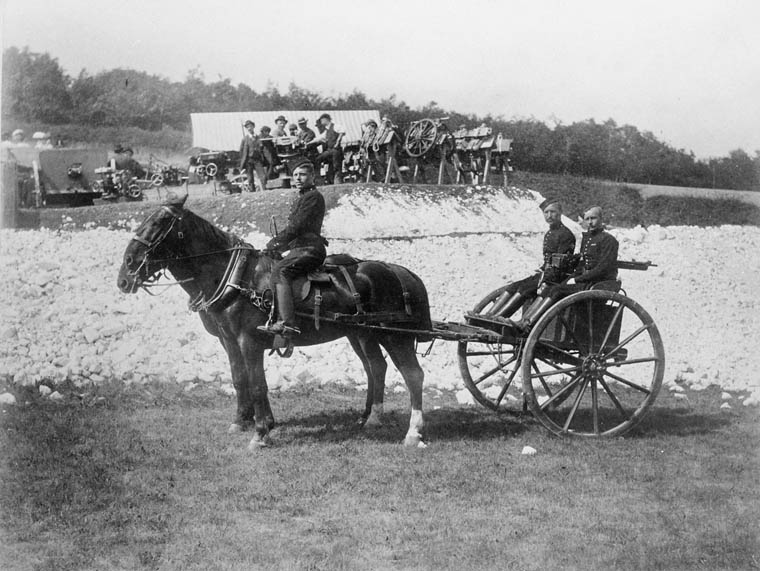
Regimental soldiers with a Nordenfelt gun, 1887

With the outbreak of the Second Boer War, the regiment sailed for South Africa in November 1899. After fighting at Colesberg, the regiment participated in the relief of Kimberley in February 1900. It was also involved at the Battle of Diamond Hill in June 1900. Following the end of the war in 1902 they went to India. Almost 375 officers and men left Cape Town on the SS Lake Manitoba in September 1902, arriving at Bombay the following month and was then stationed at Mhow in Bombay Presidency.

The regiment was next deployed in action on the North-West Frontier in 1909.

=== The First World War ===
The regiment, which was based at Potchefstroom in South Africa at the start of the war, returned to the UK and then landed at Ostend with the 6th Cavalry Brigade in the 3rd Cavalry Division in October 1914 as part of the British Expeditionary Force for service on the Western Front.

=== Inter-war ===
After the war the regiment saw brief service in Ireland. On 22 June 1921 it provided the royal escort for King George V when he opened the first Parliament of Northern Ireland. Two days later the train carrying the detachment back to the south was mined, killing and wounding twenty-four hussars and eighty of their horses. The regiment returned to the UK in 1921 and was retitled the 10th Royal Hussars (Prince of Wales's Own). Deploying to Egypt in 1929 and India in 1930, the regiment returned to the UK in 1936 and began the process of mechanisation. It was assigned to the 2nd Armoured Brigade of the 1st Armoured Division in 1939. At the same time, it became part of the Royal Armoured Corps.

=== The Second World War ===
With the outbreak of war, the 1st Armoured Division deployed to France. It fought in northern France and Belgium, returning to England without any vehicles in June 1940. In December 1940, a group of personnel was detached to form the cadre of the 23rd Hussars. In November 1941, the regiment deployed to North Africa with the 2nd Armoured Brigade, joining 7th Armoured Division. Now equipped with Crusader tanks, it saw action in Operation Crusader, at the Battle of Alam el Halfa in August 1942 and at the Second Battle of El Alamein in October 1942. At El Alamein the regiment captured General Wilhelm Ritter von Thoma, the German Deputy Commander. The regiment then fought both as an armoured unit and as dismounted infantry during the Italian Campaign in 1944 and 1945.

=== Post-war ===
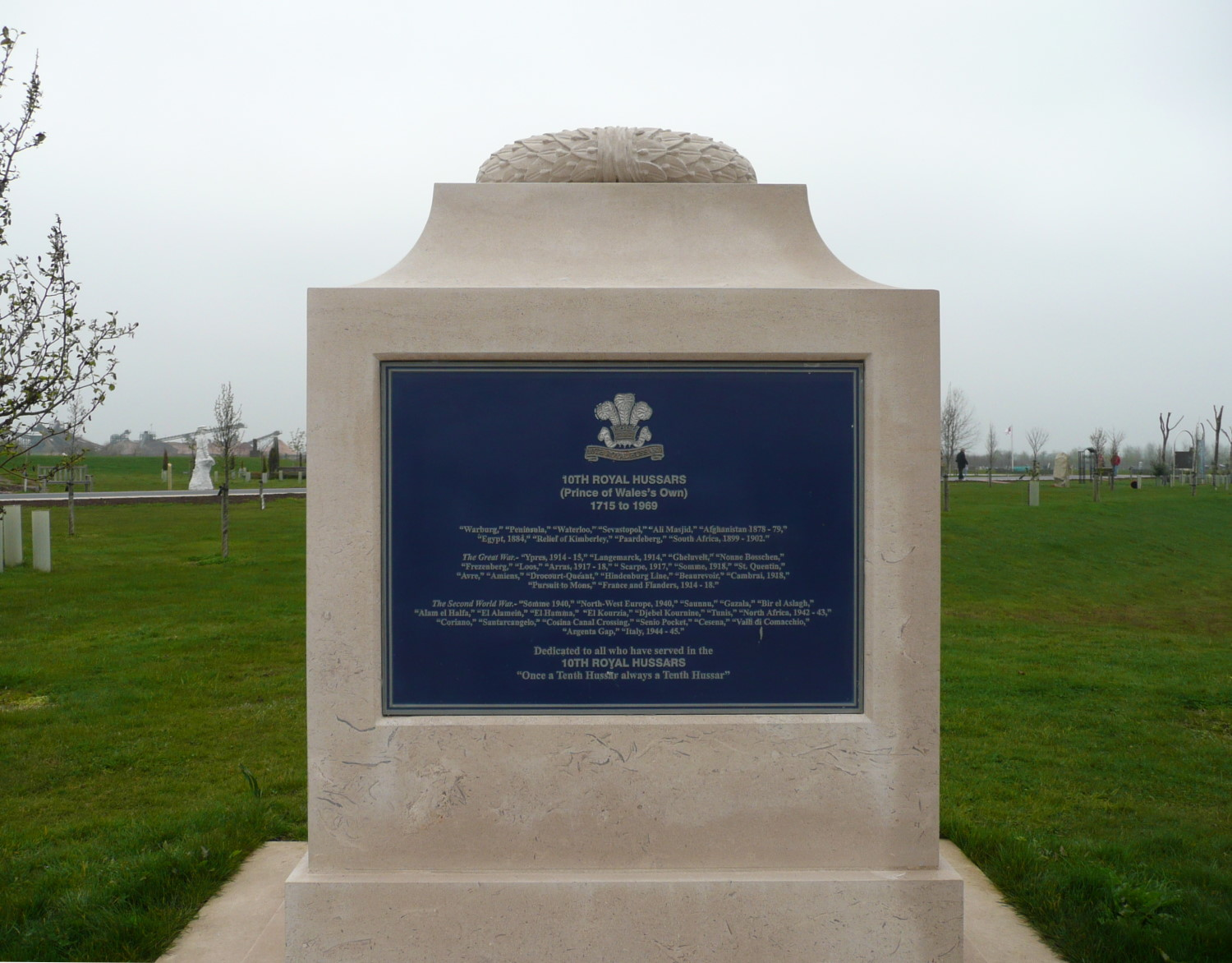
Monument to the regiment at the National Memorial Arboretum

The regiment was deployed to Lübeck in Germany as an armoured regiment in the British Army of the Rhine in 1946. It moved to Epsom Barracks in Iserlohn in 1948 and then returned to the UK in July 1953. It then deployed to Aqaba in Jordan in February 1956 in operations in support of the Jordanian Government: 19 members of the regiment were killed in an air crash at El Quweira in April 1957. After returning to the UK again in July 1957, the regiment moved to Swinton Barracks in Munster in July 1959 and then transferred to Barker Barracks in Paderborn in June 1960. It returned home again in March 1964 and then deployed to Aden in August 1964 during the Aden Emergency. The regiment moved to York Barracks in Munster in September 1965 and after returning home in September 1969, amalgamated with the 11th Hussars (Prince Albert's Own) to form the Royal Hussars (Prince of Wales's Own) in October 1969.

== Regimental museum ==
The regimental collection is held by HorsePower: The Museum of the King's Royal Hussars which is based at Peninsula Barracks in Winchester.

== Battle honours ==
The regiment's battle honours were as follows:

- Early wars: Warburg, Peninsula, Waterloo, Sevastopol, Ali Masjid, Afghanistan 1878–79, Egypt 1884, Relief of Kimberley, Paardeberg, South Africa 1899-1902
- The Great War: Ypres 1914 '15, Langemarck 1914, Gheluvelt, Nonne Bosschen, Frezenberg, Loos, Arras 1917 '18, Scarpe 1917, Somme 1918, St. Quentin, Avre, Amiens, Drocourt-Quéant, Hindenburg Line, Beaurevoir, Cambrai 1918, Pursuit to Mons, France and Flanders 1914-18
- The Second World War: Somme 1940, North-West Europe 1940, Saunnu, Gazala, Bir el Aslagh, Alam el Halfa, El Alamein, El Hamma, El Kourzia, Djebel Kournine, Tunis, North Africa 1942–43, Coriano, Santarcangelo, Cosina Canal Crossing, Senio Pocket, Cesena, Valli di Commacchio, Argenta Gap, Italy 1944-45

== Uniform ==
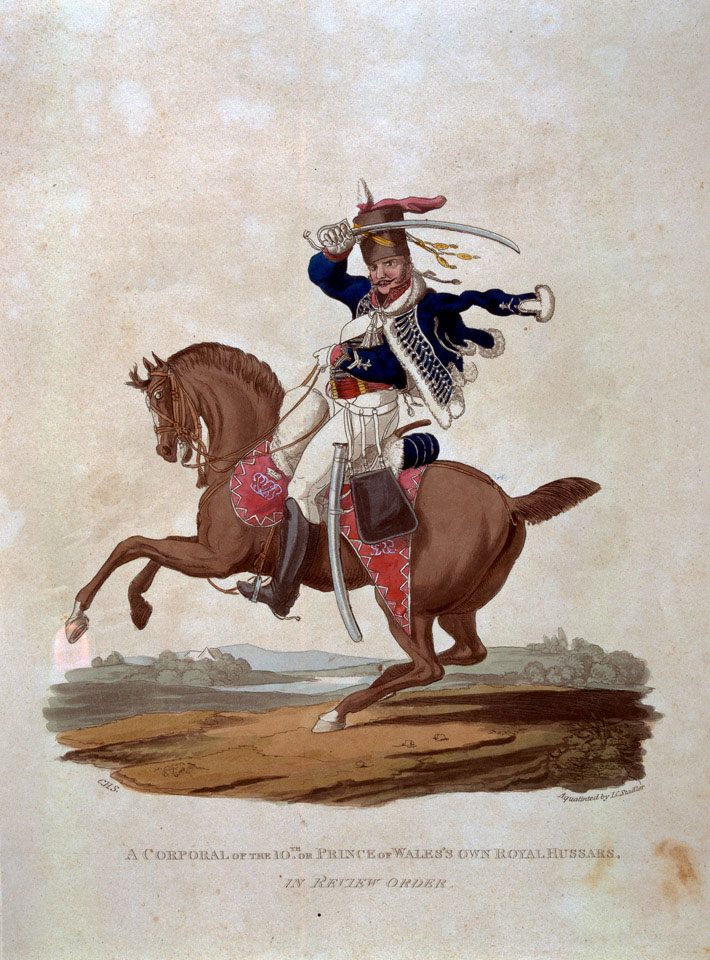
1812 engraving of a regimental corporal

The regiment wore standard red dragoon coats with "deep yellow" facings until the dark blue uniform and crested helmet of light dragoon was authorized in 1784. Hussar dress was adopted through a series of separate measures, culminating with the introduction of a busby in 1809. Until 1914 the entire regiment wore dark blue hussar uniform for full dress with a red busby bag, yellow braiding, white plume and yellow stripes on their riding breeches. Officers had a distinctive pattern of criss-crossed gilt metal decoration on their pouch-belts, which gave the regiment its nickname of "The Chainy 10th".

== Regimental band ==
The regimental band dates back to as early as 1786. In the 1850s, the band served with the regiment in India and then in Afghanistan. On the occasion of the Coronation Durbar in December 1911, when King George V visited India, trumpeters of the regiment were granted permission to wear the royal livery. When the regiment moved to Bloemfontein, the band became very popular with the public. The band also accompanied the regiment in India during the 1920s and 30s. It was one of the first bands to visit troops in France after the D-Day landings. The band then served with the hussars in West Germany during the Cold War. In 1961 it was paraded for the last time, with the last Drum Horse of the 10th Royal Hussars. When the regiment returned to Tidworth to amalgamate with the 11th Hussars in 1969, to form The Royal Hussars, the two regimental bands were merged.

== Victoria Crosses ==
- Sergeant Henry William Engleheart - Second Boer War, 13 March 1900
- Lieutenant Sir John Milbanke, 10th Baronet - Second Boer War, 5 January 1900

== Commanding Officers ==
The Commanding Officers have been:

- 1959–1962: Lt.-Col. John M.D. Ward-Harrison
- 1962–1965: Lt.-Col. William S.P. Lithgow
- 1965–1968: Lt.-Col. John B. Willis
- 1968–1969: Lt.-Col. Bernard C. Greenwood

== Colonels-in-Chief ==
- 1898–: F.M. King Edward VII
- 1910?–: F.M. King George V
- 1937–: F.M. Prince Henry, Duke of Gloucester, KG, KT, KP, GCB, GCMG, GCVO

== Regimental Colonels ==
Colonels of the Regiment were:

Humphrey Gore's Regiment of Dragoons

- 1715–1723: Lt-Gen. Humphrey Gore
- 1723–1745: Lt-Gen. Charles Churchill
- 1745–1749: F.M. Sir Richard Temple, 1st Viscount Cobham
- 1749–1780: Gen. Sir John Mordaunt, KB

10th Regiment of Dragoons (1751)

- 1780–1796: Gen. Sir William Augustus Pitt, KB

10th (Prince of Wales's Own) Regiment of (Light) Dragoons (1783)

- 1796–1820: Col. The Prince Regent

10th (The Prince of Wales's Own) Royal Regiment of (Light) Dragoons (Hussars) (1811)

- 1820–1843: Gen. Charles William Vane Stewart, 3rd Marquess of Londonderry, KG, GCB, GCH
- 1843–1863: Gen. Henry Beauchamp Lygon, 4th Earl Beauchamp

10th (Prince of Wales's Own Royal) Hussars (1861)

- 1863–1901: F.M. Prince Albert Edward, Prince of Wales KG, KT, KP, GCB, GCSI, GCMG, GCIE, GCVO
- 1901–1912: Maj-Gen. Lord Ralph Drury Kerr, KCB
- 1912–1924: Maj-Gen. Hugh Richard Dawnay, 8th Viscount Downe, KCVO, CB, CIE

10th Royal Hussars (Prince of Wales's Own)(1921)

- 1924–1935: F.M. Sir Julian Hedworth George Byng, 1st Viscount Byng of Vimy, GCB, GCMG, MVO
- 1935–1939: Brig-Gen. Thomas Walter Brand, 3rd Viscount Hampden, GCVO, KCB, CMG
- 1939–1947: Col. Victor John Greenwood, MC
- 1947–1949: Lt-Gen. Sir Charles Willoughby Moke Norrie, 1st Baron Norrie, GCMG, GCVO, CB, DSO, MC
- 1949–1952: Lt-Gen. Sir Charles Henry Gairdner, GBE, KCMG, KCVO, CB
- 1952–1962: Brig. Charles Barnet Cameron Harvey, DSO
- 1962–1969: Maj-Gen. Sir David Dawnay, KCVO, CB, DSO (to Royal Hussars)
- 1969: Regiment amalgamated with 11th Hussars (Prince Albert's Own) to form The Royal Hussars (Prince of Wales's Own)

== Alliances ==
- New Zealand - Nelson Marlborough Mounted Rifles

== Notable former members ==
- Donald Crisp
- Peter H. Jackson
- Norman Wisdom
- John Boyle O'Reilly
- William Stuttaford
- Beau Brummell
- Robert Pate
- John Lambton, 1st Earl of Durham

== Sources ==
- Cannon, Richard (1843). Historical Record of the 10th The Princes of Wales's Own Royal Regiment of Hussars. John W. Parker.
