= Royal Hussars =

Royal Hussars (Prince of Wales' Own)
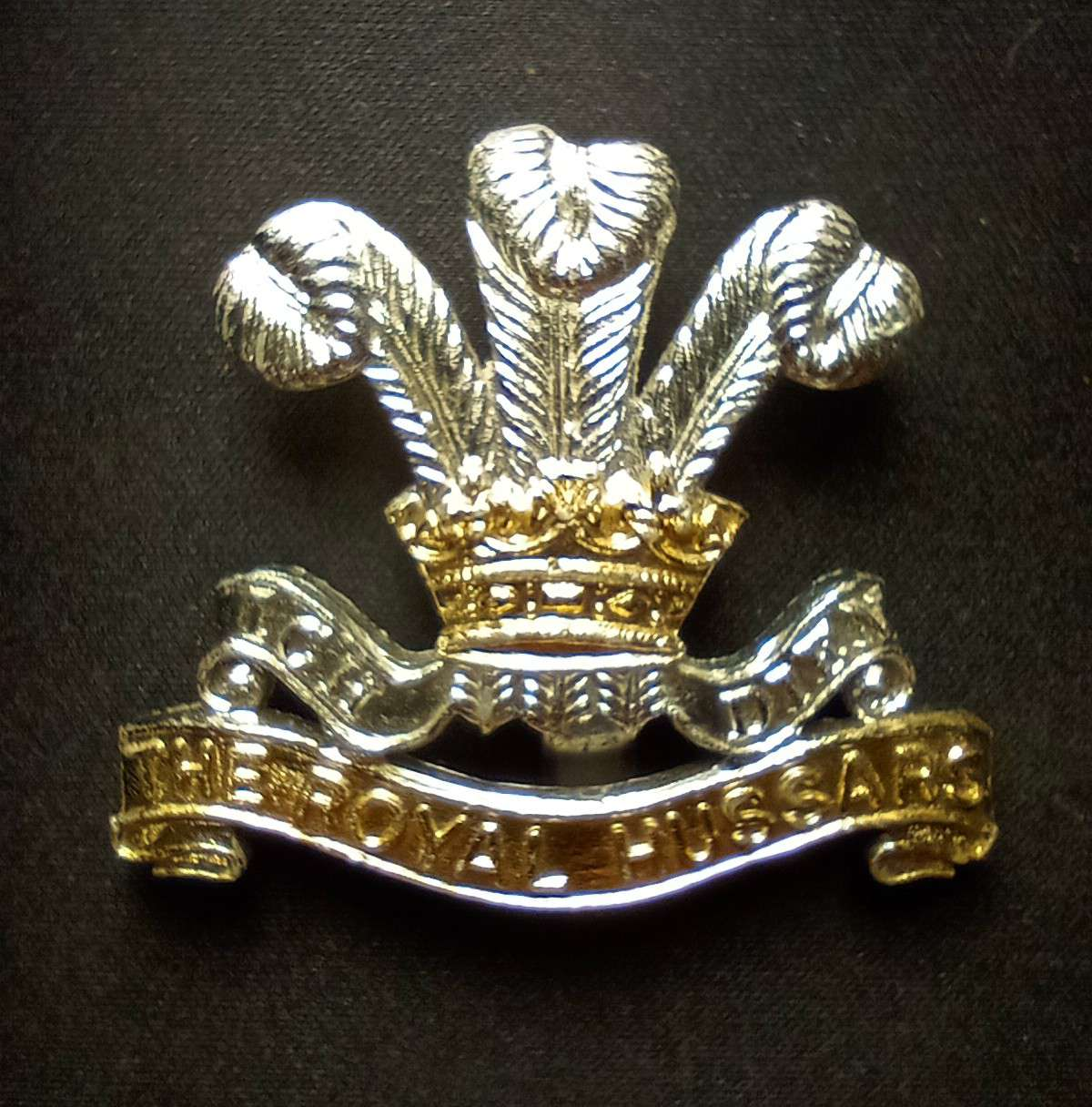
- Active: 1969–1992
- Country: United Kingdom
- Branch: British Army
- Type: Line Cavalry
- Size: One regiment
- Motto: Ich Dien (German: I Serve)
- March: Quick - The Merry Month of May

Commanders
- Colonel-in-Chief: Princess Alice, Duchess of Gloucester

The Royal Hussars (Prince of Wales's Own) was a cavalry regiment of the British Army. It was formed by the amalgamation of the 10th Royal Hussars and the 11th Hussars in 1969 and it amalgamated with the 14th/20th King's Hussars to form the King's Royal Hussars in 1992.

== History ==
The regiment was formed at Perham Down by the amalgamation of the 10th Royal Hussars and the 11th Hussars on 25 October 1969. It was initially based at Bhurtpore Barracks in Tidworth Camp as part of 5th Infantry Brigade and deployed several units to Cyprus and several units to Northern Ireland over the next two years. It transferred to 6th Armoured Brigade and moved to Athlone Barracks in Sennelager in July 1973 from where it continued to deploy units to Northern Ireland. In April 1979 most of the regiment moved to Cambrai Barracks at Catterick Garrison while one squadron deployed to Smuts Barracks in Berlin as Berlin Armoured Squadron.

The regiment joined 7th Armoured Brigade and moved to Lumsden Barracks at Bad Fallingbostel in March 1981 and became the first unit to be equipped with the Challenger 1 main battle tank in 1983. It deployed a unit to Northern Ireland for guarding duties at the Maze Prison in 1986. It transferred to 1st Infantry Brigade based at Bhurtpore Barracks in Tidworth Camp in November 1988 and then moved back to West Germany to join 4th Armoured Brigade with its base at Swinton Barracks in Münster in December 1990. The regiment was amalgamated with the 14th/20th King's Hussars to form the King's Royal Hussars on 4 December 1992.

== Colonel-in-Chief ==
- 1969 Princess Alice, Duchess of Gloucester, GCB CI, GCVO, GBE

== Regimental Colonels ==
Colonels of the Regiment were:

- 1969–1971: Maj-Gen. Sir David Dawnay, KVCO, CB, DSO (ex 10th Hussars)
- 1971–1974: Col. Sir John Charles Arthur Digby Lawson, Bt, DSO, MC (ex 11th Hussars)
- 1974–1984: Maj. (Hon. Lt-Col.) Thomas Armitage Hall, OBE
- 1984–1990: Lt-Col. Sir Piers Henry George Bengough, KCVO, OBE, DL
- 1990–1992: Maj-Gen. John Peter William Friedberger, CBE (to King's Royal Hussars)
- 1992: Regiment amalgamated with 14th/20th King's Hussars to form King's Royal Hussars

== Alliances ==
The regiment's alliances included:

- Canada 1st Hussars
- Australia 10th Light Horse
