= James Leith =

James Leith is the name of:

- James Leith (British Army officer, born 1763) (1763–1816), Scottish lieutenant-general in the Napoleonic Wars
- James Leith (VC) (1826–1869), Scottish recipient of the Victoria Cross
- James Leith Leith (born 1896), First World War fighter ace
