= James Leith (VC) =

Scottish recipient of the Victoria Cross

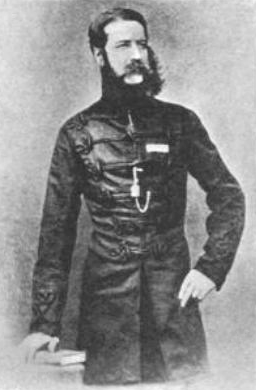
- Born: 26 May 1826; Glenkindie, Aberdeenshire, Scotland
- Died: 13 May 1869 (aged 42); Paddington, London, England
- Burial place: Towie Churchyard
- Military career
- Branch: British Army
- Rank: Major
- Units: 14th Light Dragoons; Royal Scots Greys
- Conflicts: Anglo-Persian War; Indian Mutiny
- Awards: Victoria Cross
- Other work: Cambridge University Cricketer

Major James Leith VC (26 May 1826 – 13 May 1869) was a Scottish recipient of the Victoria Cross, the highest and most prestigious award for gallantry in the face of the enemy that can be awarded to British and Commonwealth forces.

== Life ==
James Leith was the son of General Alexander Leith of Freefield and Glenkindie, Aberdeenshire and educated at Blackheath Proprietary School and Trinity College, Cambridge. He played cricket for Cambridge University from 1846 to 1849.

Leith was 31 years old, and a lieutenant in the 14th Light Dragoons (later 14th Hussars (The King's)), British Army during the Indian Mutiny when, on 1 April 1858 at Betwa, India, the following deed led to his being awarded the Victoria Cross:

For conspicuous bravery at Betwah, on the 1st of April, 1858, in having, charged alone, and rescued Captain Need, of the same Regiment, when surrounded by a large number of rebel Infantry. Despatch from Major-General Sir Hugh Henry Rose, G.C.B., dated 28th April, 1858.

The medal is currently displayed at the 14th/20th King's Hussars gallery of the Museum of Lancashire, Preston, Lancashire.

He was appointed to the Honourable Corps of Gentlemen at Arms in 1868.
