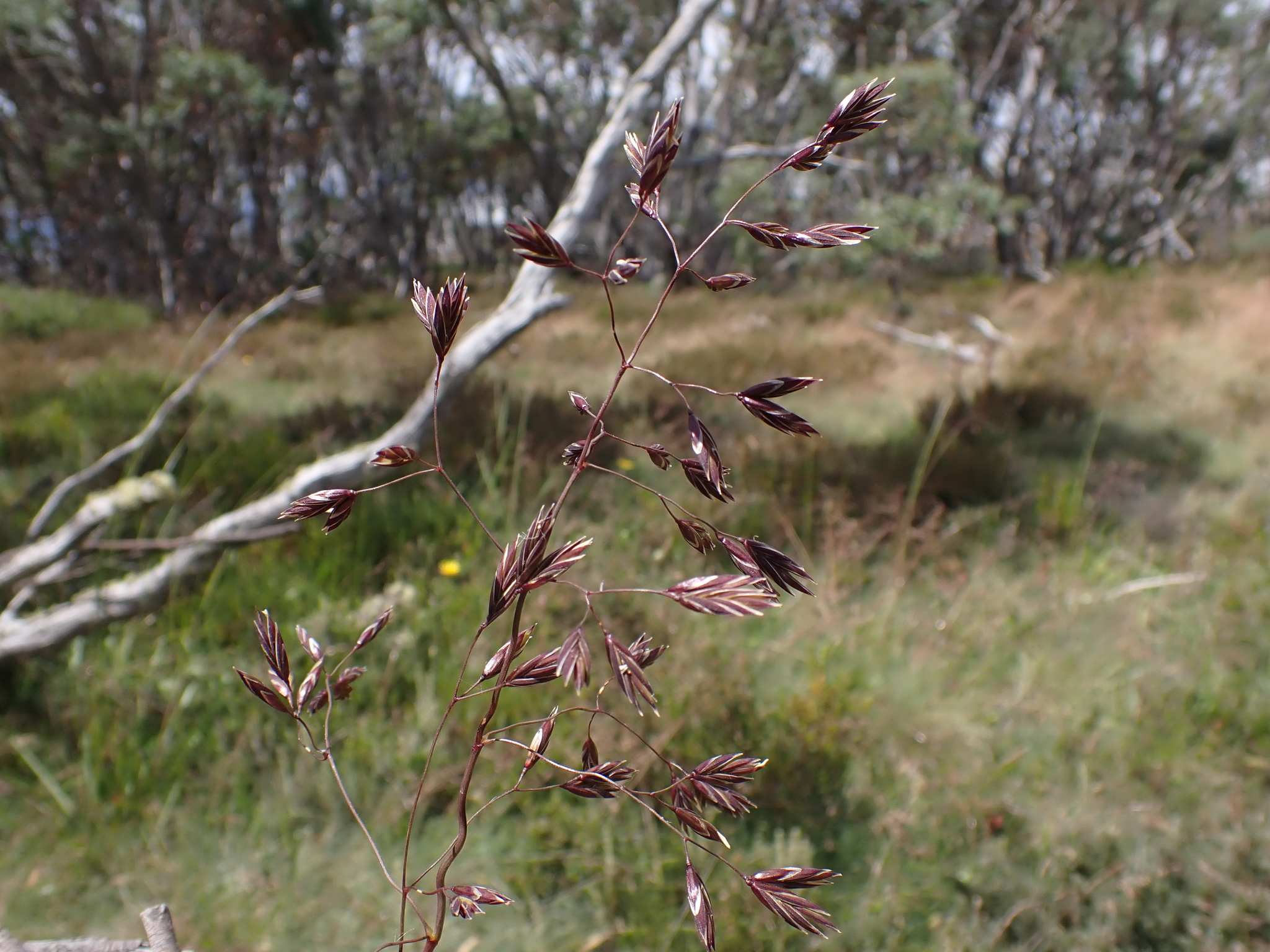

Scientific classification
- Kingdom: Plantae
- Clade: Tracheophytes
- Clade: Angiosperms
- Clade: Monocots
- Clade: Commelinids
- Order: Poales
- Family: Poaceae
- Subfamily: Pooideae
- Genus: Festuca
- Species: F. muelleri

Binomial name
- Festuca muelleri Vickery

= Festuca muelleri =

Species of grass

Festuca muelleri is a species of grass in the family Poaceae. It is native to south-eastern Australia. It is perennial and grows in temperate biomes.
