= 14th King's Hussars =

British Army cavalry regiment

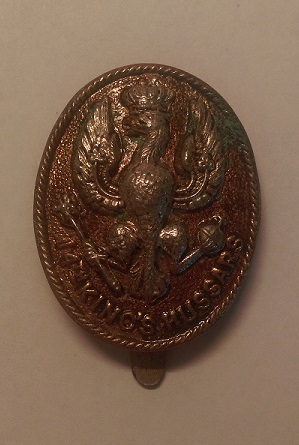
- Badge of the 14th King's Hussars
- Active: 1715-1922
- Country: Great Britain (1715–1800); United Kingdom (1801–1922)
- Branch: British Army
- Type: Cavalry
- Role: Line Cavalry
- Size: 1 Regiment
- Nicknames: Hawks; The Emperor's Chambermaids

The 14th King's Hussars was a cavalry regiment in the British Army, first raised in 1715. It saw service for two centuries, including the First World War, before being amalgamated with the 20th Hussars to form the 14th/20th King's Hussars in 1922.

== History ==
=== Early wars ===
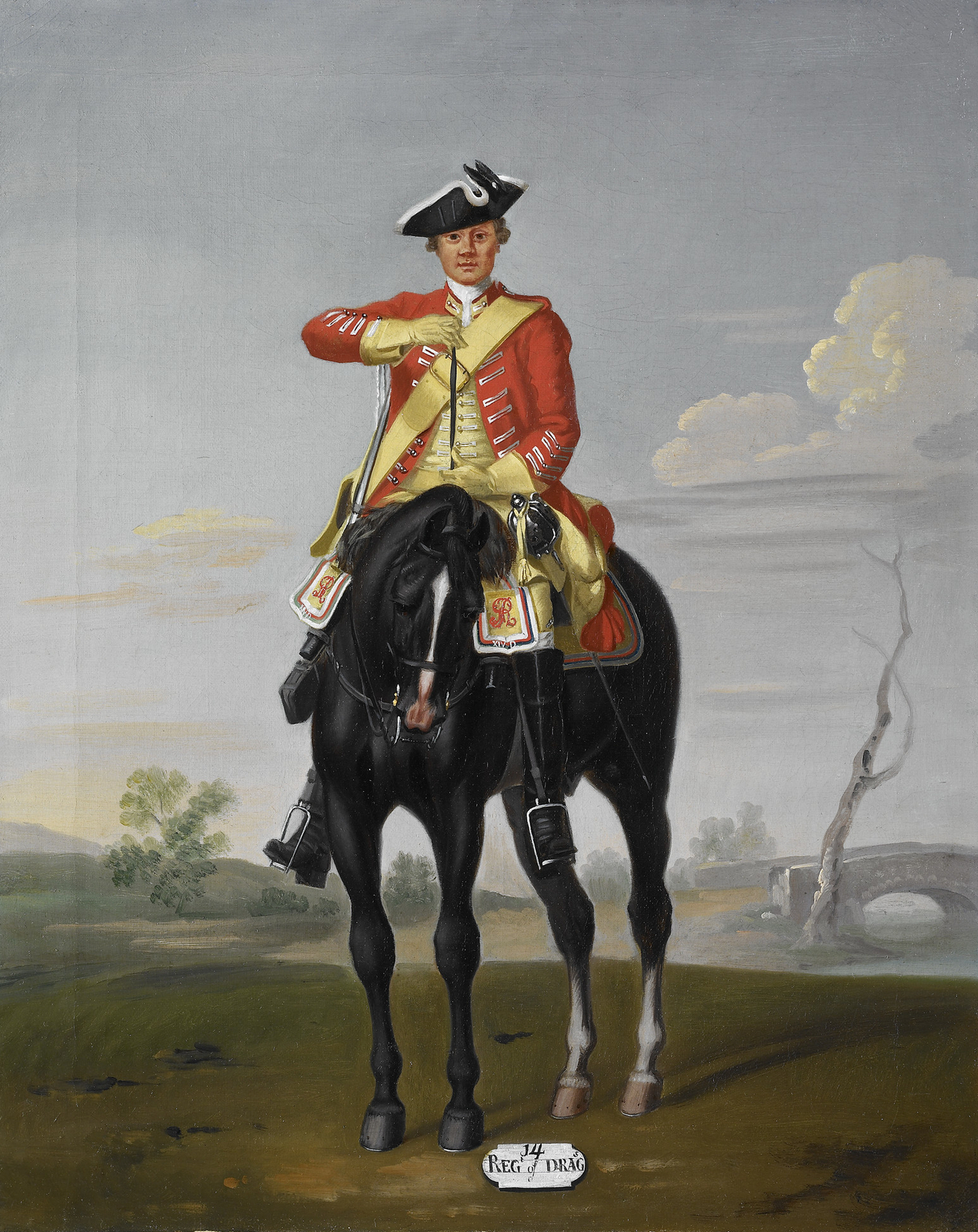
c. 1751 portrait of a regimental private

The regiment was raised in the south of England by Brigadier-General James Dormer as James Dormer's Regiment of Dragoons, and ranked as the 14th Dragoons, in 1715 as part of the response to the Jacobite rebellion. It took part in the Battle of Preston in November 1715 after which it escorted some of the rebels to Lancaster Gaol. The regiment was sent to Ireland in 1717 and remained there until 1742. It fought but was completely outflanked at the Battle of Prestonpans in September 1745 and then took part in the equally disastrous Battle of Falkirk Muir in January 1746 during the Jacobite rising of 1745. The regiment returned to Ireland in 1747 and it was formally renamed as the 14th Regiment of Dragoons in 1751. It became a light dragoon regiment in 1776, as the 14th Regiment of (Light) Dragoons, and two troops were detached and joined 8th Light Dragoons in the Low Countries in 1794 for service in the Flanders Campaign. Then seven troops were detached and deployed to the French colony of Saint-Domingue in 1795 during the Haitian Revolution; they took part in an action at Mirebalais in June 1797 in which they helped defeat 1,200 ex-slaves who were sympathetic to new regime in France.

The regiment was renamed for Princess Frederica in 1798 as the 14th (The Duchess of York's Own) Regiment of (Light) Dragoons and allowed to use the Prussian Eagle as its badge. The regiment was dispatched to Lisbon in December 1808 to join Sir Arthur Wellesley's Army which was engaged in the Peninsular War. The regiment fought at the Second Battle of Porto in May 1809 during which one of the French brigade commanders, General Maximilien Foy, was wounded in an action involving a squadron of the regiment.

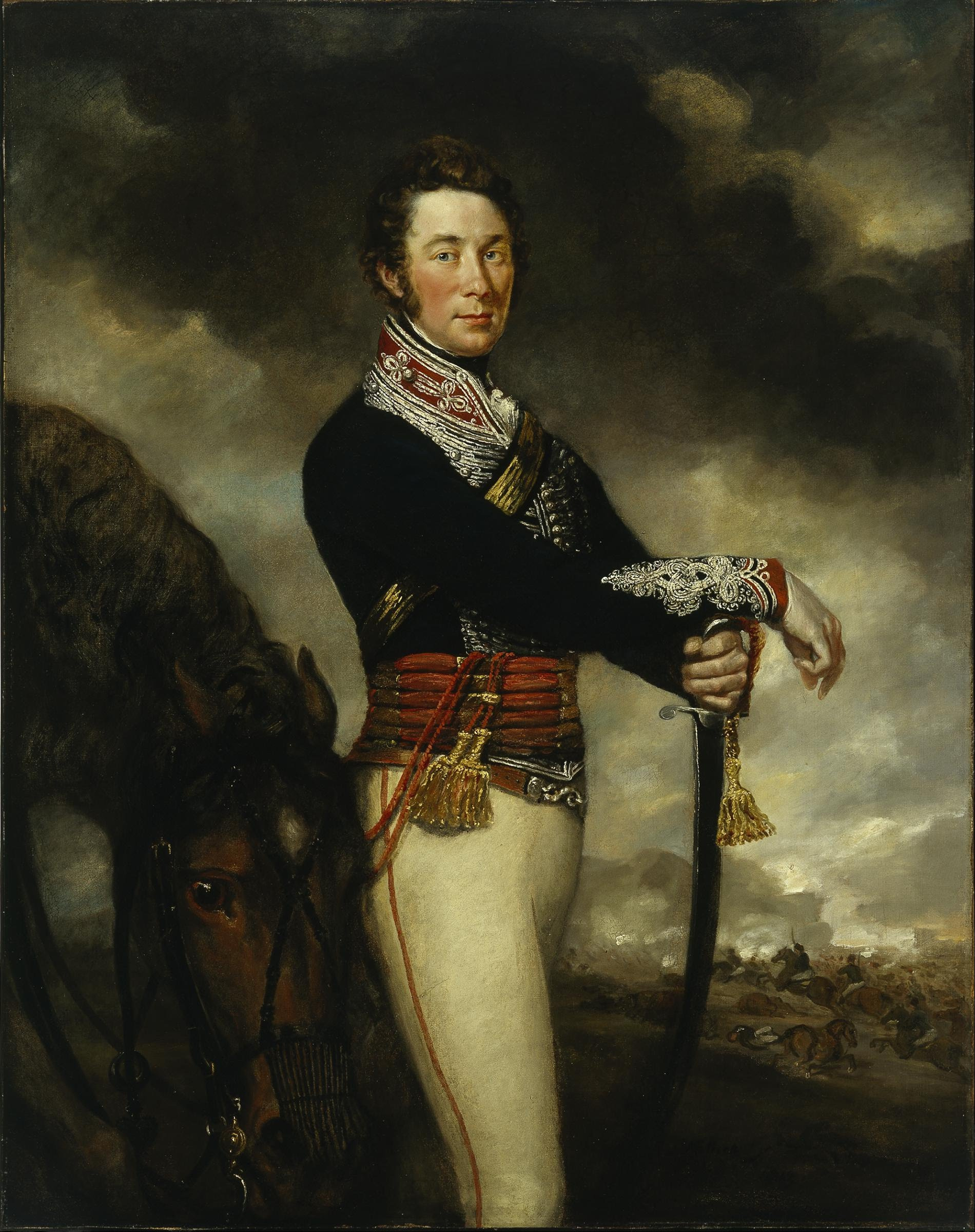
c. 1812 portrait of a regimental captain

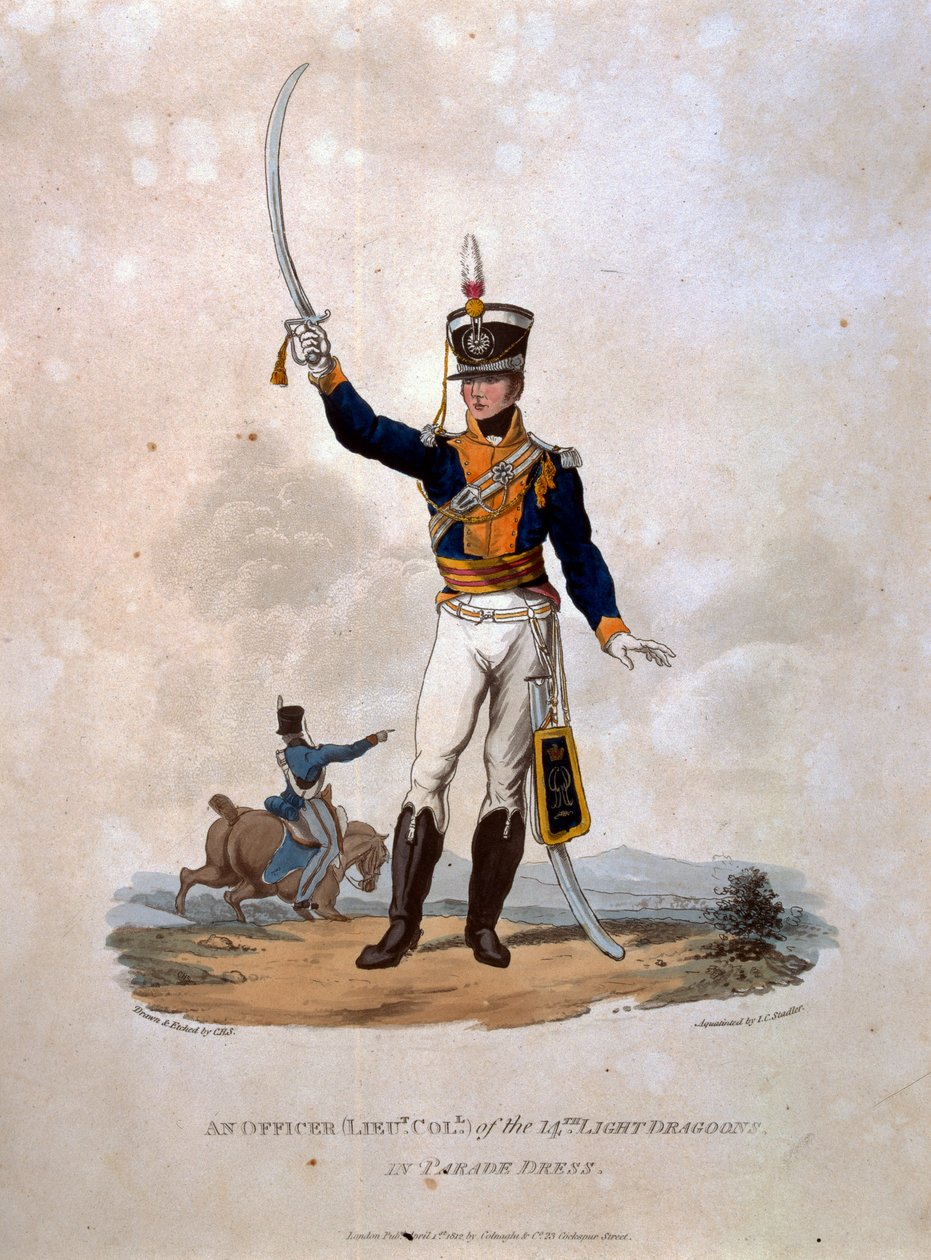
1812 engraving of a regimental lieutenant colonel

The regiment fought at the Battle of Talavera in July 1809 and saw hard action at Barquilla on 11 July 1810 during which the commanding officer of the regiment, Lieutenant-Colonel Neil Talbot, and eight of his men were killed. The regiment, now under the command of Lieutenant-Colonel Felton Hervey-Bathurst, then took part in a skirmish on the Coa river on 24 July 1810 and, in pressing home a frontal attack on a French artillery battery, a squadron of the regiment was badly mauled at the Battle of Fuentes de Oñoro in May 1811. The following year was a very busy one for the regiment: the regiment fought at the Siege of Ciudad Rodrigo in January 1812, the Siege of Badajoz in March 1812, the Battle of Villagarcia in April 1812 and the Battle of Salamanca in July 1812.

During the Battle of Vitoria in June 1813 the regiment captured a silver chamberpot belonging to King Joseph Bonaparte, brother of the Emperor Napoleon, which resulted in the regimental nickname of "The Emperor's Chambermaids". The chamberpot, named The Emperor, is still retained by their successor regiment the King's Royal Hussars. The regiment advanced into France performing a supporting role at the Battle of Orthez in February 1814 and at the Battle of Toulouse in April 1814. The regiment went back to England in July 1814, but deployed two squadrons to North America where, dismounted, they took part in the Battle of New Orleans on 8 January 1815 in the closing stages of the War of 1812. The regiment served in Ireland between January 1816 and June 1819 and between April 1825 and March 1828.

=== The Victorian era ===
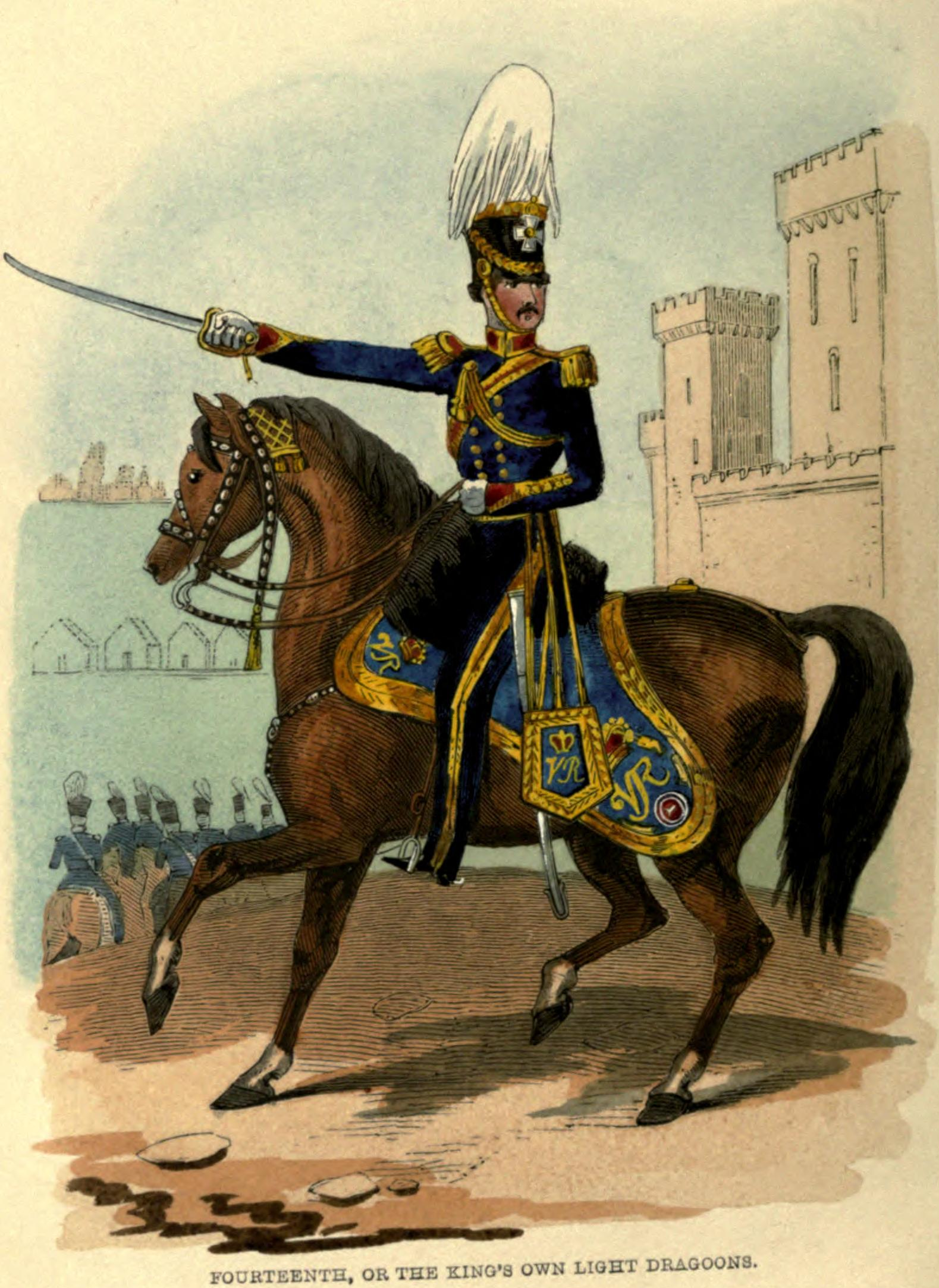
1847 illustration of the regimental uniform

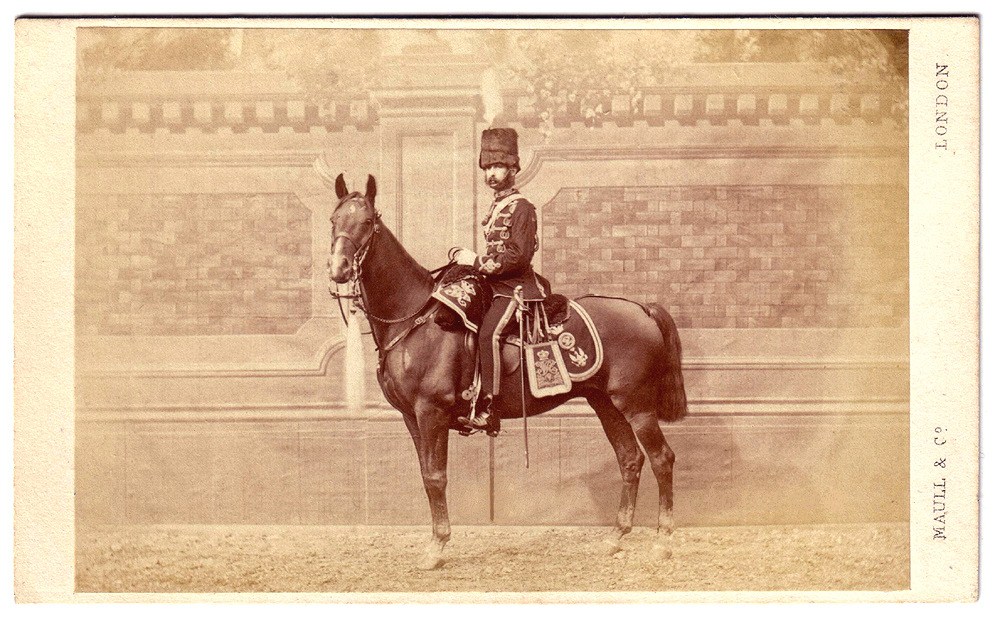
Carte-de-Visite of a lieutenant in the 14th (King's) Hussars. Maull & Co. Studios, London, 1867

The regiment was renamed in July 1830, to mark the coronation of William IV as the 14th (The King's) Regiment of (Light) Dragoons, and it took part in the suppression of the Bristol riots in October 1831. It was dispatched to India in May 1841. The regiment marched from Kirkee in the west of the country to Ambala in the north of the country through the winter of 1845 during the First Anglo-Sikh War.

The commanding officer of the regiment, Colonel William Havelock, led a charge, apparently without orders, at the Battle of Ramnagar in November 1848 during the Second Anglo-Sikh War. Havelock and his leading troopers were surrounded and cut down. After a further charge failed, Brigadier Charles Cureton, the commander of the cavalry division to which the troops belonged, galloped up and ordered a retreat. Cureton himself was then killed by musket fire. The regiment were routed at the Battle of Chillianwala in January 1849 but redeemed themselves at the Battle of Gujrat in February 1849. It also took part in an expedition under Lieutenant-General Sir James Outram against Persia in spring 1857 during the Anglo-Persian War.

The regiment returned to India in May 1857 and took part in the Central Indian campaign during 1858 in the latter stages of the Indian Rebellion. Major James Leith was awarded the Victoria Cross during this campaign; the regiment were ordered home in February 1860. The title of the regiment was simplified in August 1861 to the 14th (King's) Hussars.

=== 20th century ===
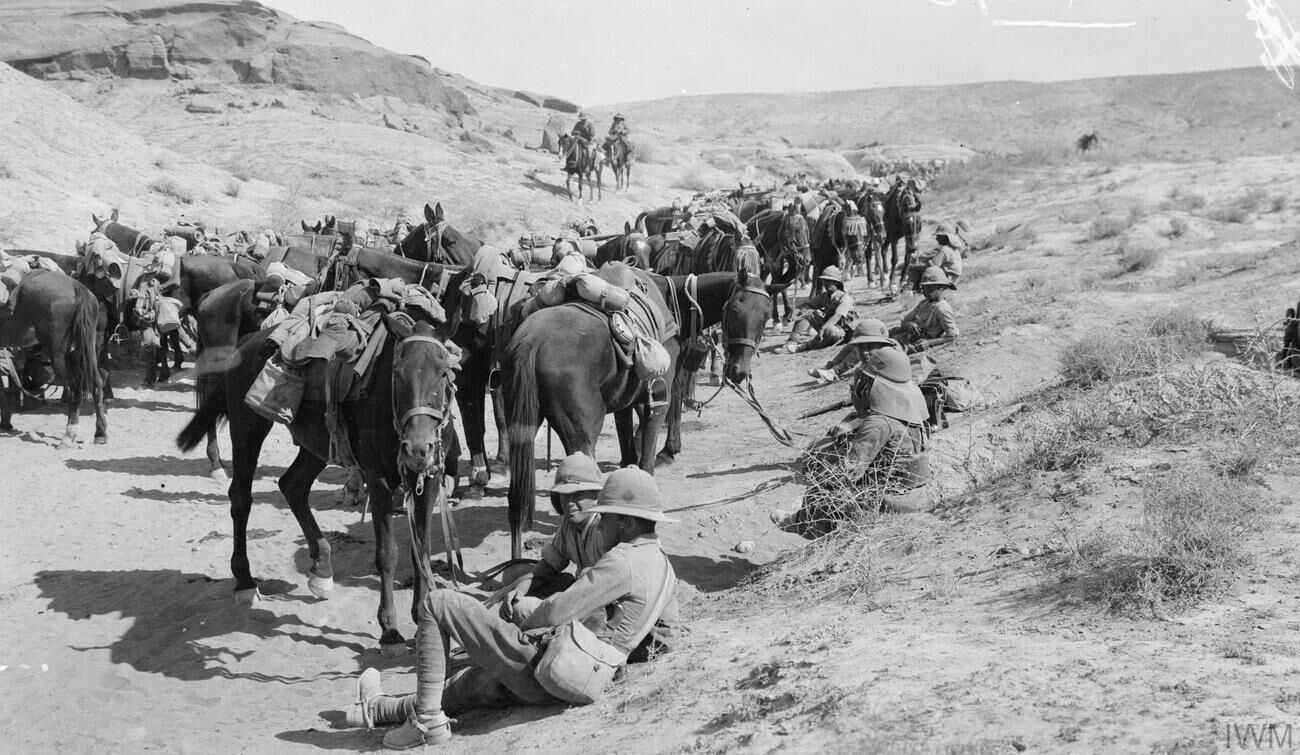
The 14th King's Hussars resting at the roadside on their way back from the third action of Jebel Hamrin, December 1917.

The regiment arrived in South Africa in January 1900 and took part in the relief of Kimberley in February 1900 during the Second Boer War. The regiment, which was serving in Mhow in India as part of the Meerut Cavalry Brigade in the Meerut Divisional Area at the start of the First World War landed in Mesopotamia in November 1915. It was involved in most of the actions during the Mesopotamian campaign before moving to Persia in May 1918. The regiment retitled as the 14th King's Hussars in January 1921 and was amalgamated with the 20th Hussars to form the 14th/20th King's Hussars in October 1922.

== Regimental museum ==
The Museum of the 14th/20th King's Hussars was in the Museum of Lancashire in Preston until it closed in 2016.

== Battle honours ==
The regiment's battle honours were as follows:

- Early wars: Douro, Talavera, Fuentes d'Onor, Salamanca, Vittoria, Pyrenees, Orthes, Peninsula, Chillianwallah, Goojerat, Punjaub, Persia, Central India, Relief of Ladysmith, South Africa 1900–02
- The Great War: Tigris 1916, Kut al Amara 1917, Baghdad, Mesopotamia 1915–18, Persia 1918

== Victoria Crosses ==
- Major Edward Douglas Brown – Second Boer War, 13 October 1900
- Lieutenant James Leith – Indian Mutiny, 1 April 1858

== Regimental Colonels ==
Colonels of the Regiment were:

James Dormer's Regiment of Dragoons

- 1715–1720: Lt-Gen. James Dormer
- 1720–1737: Lt-Gen. Clement Neville
- 1737–1749: Lt-Gen. Archibald Hamilton
- 1749–1752: F.M. James O'Hara, 2nd Baron Tyrawley

14th Regiment of Dragoons (1751)

- 1752–1757: Lt-Gen. Louis Dejean
- 1757–1765: F.M. John Campbell, 5th Duke of Argyll (Marquess of Lorne)
- 1765–1772: Gen. Charles FitzRoy, 1st Baron Southampton
- 1772–1773: Lt-Gen. Daniel Webb
- 1773–1778: Gen. George Warde

14th Regiment of (Light) Dragoons (1776)

- 1778–1797: Gen. Sir Robert Sloper, KB
- 1797–1823: Gen. John William Egerton, 7th Earl of Bridgwater

14th (The Duchess of York's Own) Regiment of (Light) Dragoons (1798)

- 1823–1830: Gen. Sir John Ormsby Vandeleur, GCB

14th (The King's) Regiment of (Light) Dragoons (1830)

- 1830–1853: Gen. Sir Edward Kerrison, Bt, KCB, GCH
- 1853–1860: Gen. Hon. Sir Henry Murray, KCB
- 1860: Lt-Gen. Allan Thomas Maclean
- 1860–1871: Gen. William Beckwith

14th (King's) Hussars (1861)

- 1871–1873: Gen. Henry Richmond Jones, CB
- 1873–1882: Gen. John Wilkie
- 1882–1896: Gen. Charles William Thompson
- 1896–1903: Lt-Gen. Hon Charles Wemyss Thesiger
- 1903–1904: Maj-Gen. Thomas Phillips
- 1904–1920: Maj-Gen. Boyce Albert Combe, CB

14th King's Hussars (1921)

- 1920–1922: Maj-Gen. Sir Henry West Hodgson, KCMG, CB, CVO (to 14th/20th Hussars)
- 1922: Regiment amalgamated with the 20th Hussars to form the 14th/20th Hussars

== See also ==
- British cavalry during the First World War
