= 20th Hussars =

British Army cavalry regiment

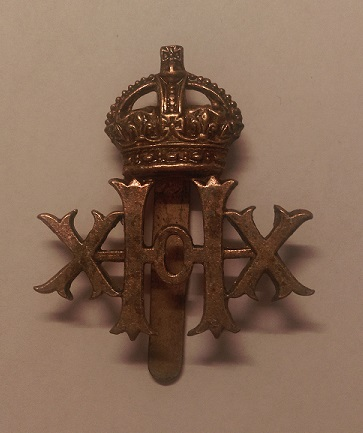
- Badge of the 20th Hussars
- Active: 1858–1922
- Country: United Kingdom
- Branch: British Army
- Type: Cavalry
- Role: Line Cavalry
- Size: One Regiment
- Nickname: Nobody's Own

The 20th Hussars was a cavalry regiment of the British Army. After service in the First World War it was amalgamated with the 14th King's Hussars to form the 14th/20th King's Hussars in 1922.

== History ==
=== Early wars ===
The regiment was originally raised in Bengal by the East India Company as the 2nd Bengal European Light Cavalry in 1858, for service in the response to the Indian Rebellion. It was renamed the 2nd Bengal European Cavalry in 1859 and in 1862, while based in Mathura, it was transferred to the British Army and renamed the 20th Regiment of Hussars. It became the 20th Hussars in 1877.

The regiment remained on the North West Frontier and participated in the Ambela Campaign in autumn 1863 and the Hazara Expedition in October 1868 before moving to England in 1872. The regiment was based in Ireland from 1879 to 1884.

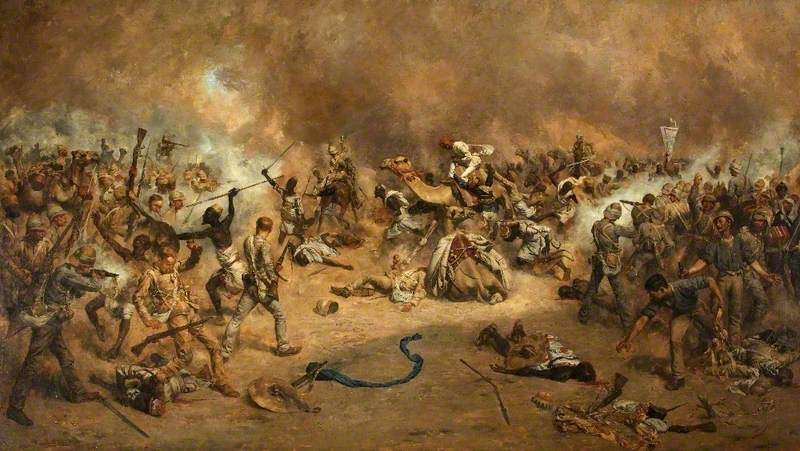
The Battle of Tofrek, at which the 20th Hussars were present, March 1885

The regiment was sent to Sudan as part of the Suakin Expedition in February 1885 and took part in the Battle of Tofrek in March 1885 and the Battle of Ginnis in December 1885. It also took part in the Battle of Gemeizeh in December 1888 during the Mahdist War when it made a series of charges against the enemy. In this battle, three of the swords of the 20th Hussars broke short, an incident which later caused debate in the House of Commons. It undertook another successful charge at the Battle of Toski in August 1889. After their return to England in 1890, the regiment was awarded the battle honour "Suakin 1885" for its services in Egypt and also the battle honour "Vimiera" in respect of the earlier services of its predecessor regiment, the 20th Light Dragoons. The regiment returned to India in 1895.

=== 20th century ===
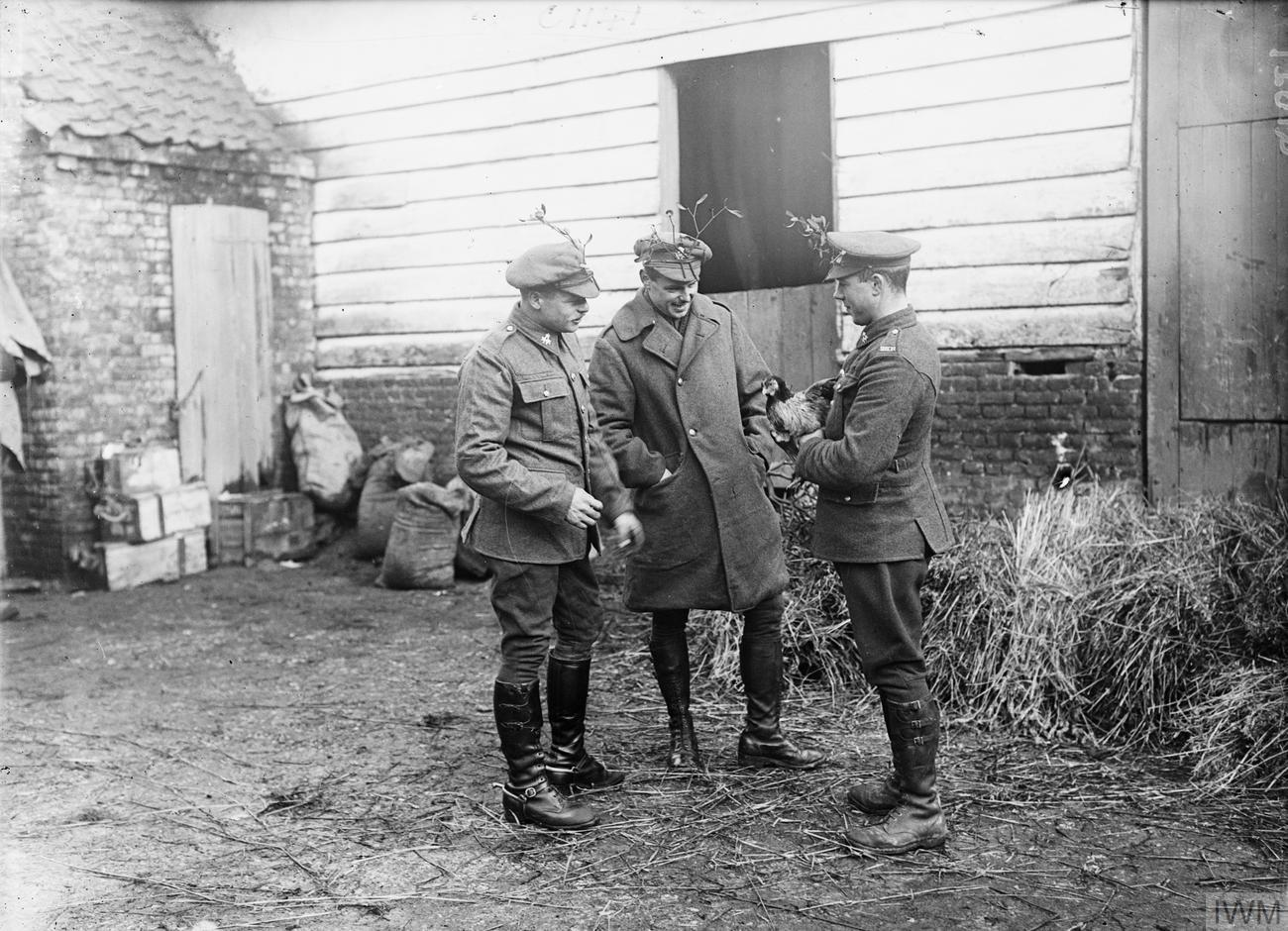
Men of the 20th Hussars, Bailleul, December 1916.

The regiment was not deployed to South Africa until December 1901 for service in the Second Boer War and therefore only took part in the final drives against the Boer commandos in spring 1902. The regiment was based in Ireland again from 1908 to 1911.

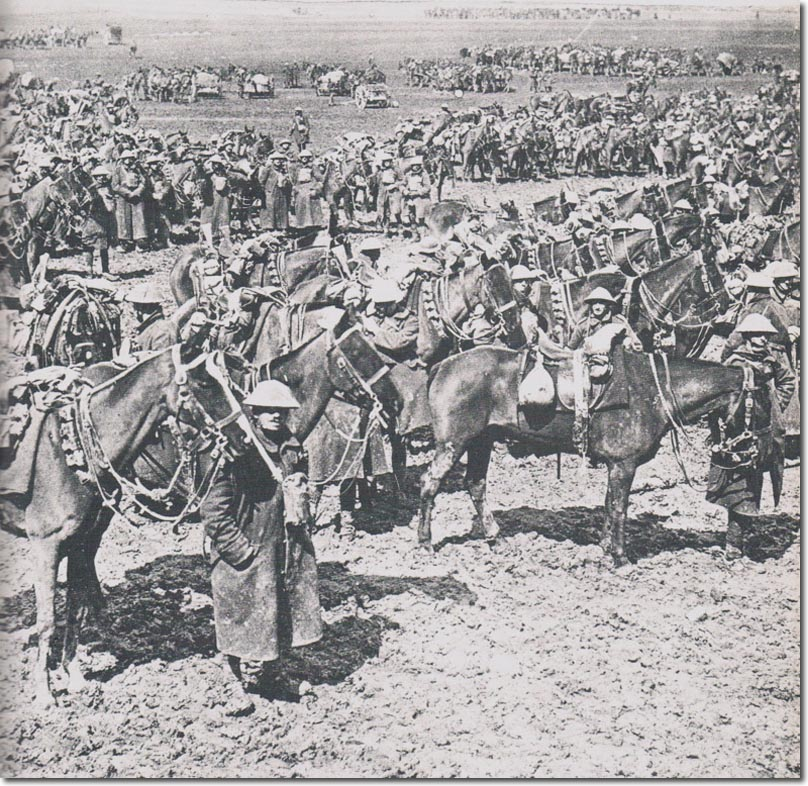
The 20th Hussars at Areas, 1917.

The regiment, which was based in Colchester at the start of the First World War, landed in France as part of the 5th Cavalry Brigade in the 2nd Cavalry Division in August 1914 for service on the First World War. The regiment saw action at the Battle of Mons in August 1914 and both the First Battle of the Marne and the First Battle of the Aisne in September 1914. It went on fight at the First Battle of Ypres in October 1914, the Battle of Arras in April 1917 and the Battle of Cambrai in November 1917. It later took part in the German spring offensive in 1918, the Battle of Amiens in August 1918 and the final push as the war drew to a close.

A nationalist uprising in Turkey caused the allies to send troops to Constantinople. The regiment was deployed to the İzmit peninsula in 1920 as part of a formation under General Sir Edmund Ironside's command. The regiment charged Turkish positions in July near the village of Gebze and successfully routed the enemy. Although mounted action did take place in Syria during the Second World War, this was the last regimental charge ever made by British cavalry. The regiment suffered one casualty, although several horses were also wounded. The regiment was amalgamated in 1922 with the 14th King's Hussars to form the 14th/20th King's Hussars.

== Regimental museum ==
The Museum of the 14th/20th King's Hussars was in the Museum of Lancashire in Preston until it closed in 2016.

== Battle honours ==
The regiment's battle honours were as follows:

- Early wars: Vimiera, Peninsula, Suakin 1885, South Africa 1901-02
- The Great War: Mons, Retreat from Mons; Marne 1914; Aisne 1914; Messines 1914; Ypres 1914, 1915; Neuve Chapelle; St. Julien; Bellewaarde; Arras 1917; Scarpe 1917; Cambrai 1917, 1918; Somme 1918; Saint-Quentin; Lys; Hazebrouck; Amiens; Albert 1918; Bapaume 1918; Hindenburg Line; St. Quentin Canal; Beaurevoir; Sambre, France and Flanders 1914–18

== Regimental Colonels ==
Colonels of the Regiment were: 2nd Bengal European Light Cavalry

- 1858–1862: Lt-Gen. Thomas Shubrick

20th Regiment of Hussars (1862)

- 1862–1870: Lt-Gen. Charles Montauban Carmichael, CB
- 1870–1883: Gen. Michael William Smith

20th Hussars

- 1883–1891: Lt-Gen. Richard Knox
- 1891–1910: Lt-Gen. Sir Roger William Henry Palmer, Bt
- 1910–1920: Maj-Gen. Hugh Sutlej Gough, CB, CMG
- 1920–1922: Gen. Sir George De Symons Barrow, GCB, KCMG (to 14th/20th Hussars)
- 1921 disbanded
- 1922: one squadron re-formed and amalgamated with 14th King's Hussars, to form the 14th/20th Hussars

== See also ==
- British cavalry during the First World War
- White mutiny

== Sources ==
- Carver, Field Marshal Lord (1998). Britain's Army in the 20th Century. Macmillan Publishers. ISBN 0-330-37200-9.
- Darling, Major J. C. (2003). 20th Hussars in the Great War. Naval & Military Press. ISBN 1-84342-538-6.
- Galloway, W. (2012) [1887]. The Battle of Tofrek, fought near Suakin, March 22nd 1885. Naval & Military Press. ISBN 978-1-78149-047-1.
- Marquess of Anglesey (1997). History of the British Cavalry, 1816–1919. Vol. 8. Leo Cooper, London. ISBN 978-0-85052-467-3.
