= 26th Hussars =

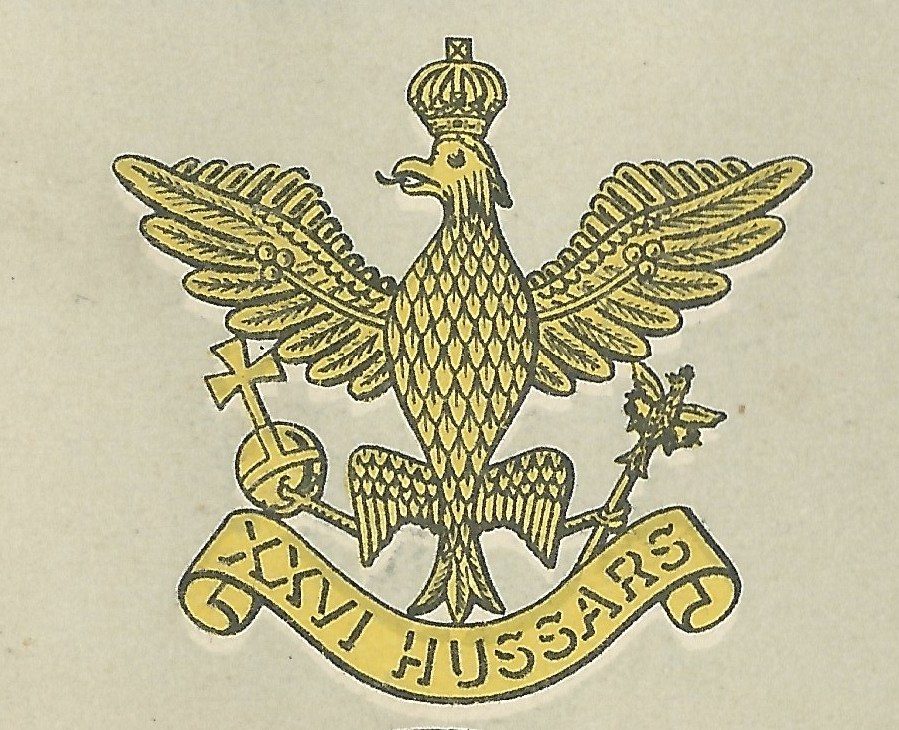
- Cap Badge of the 26th Hussars ca 1941
- Active: 1941–1943
- Country: United Kingdom
- Branch: British Army
- Type: Cavalry
- Role: Armoured Regiment
- Size: 1 Regiment

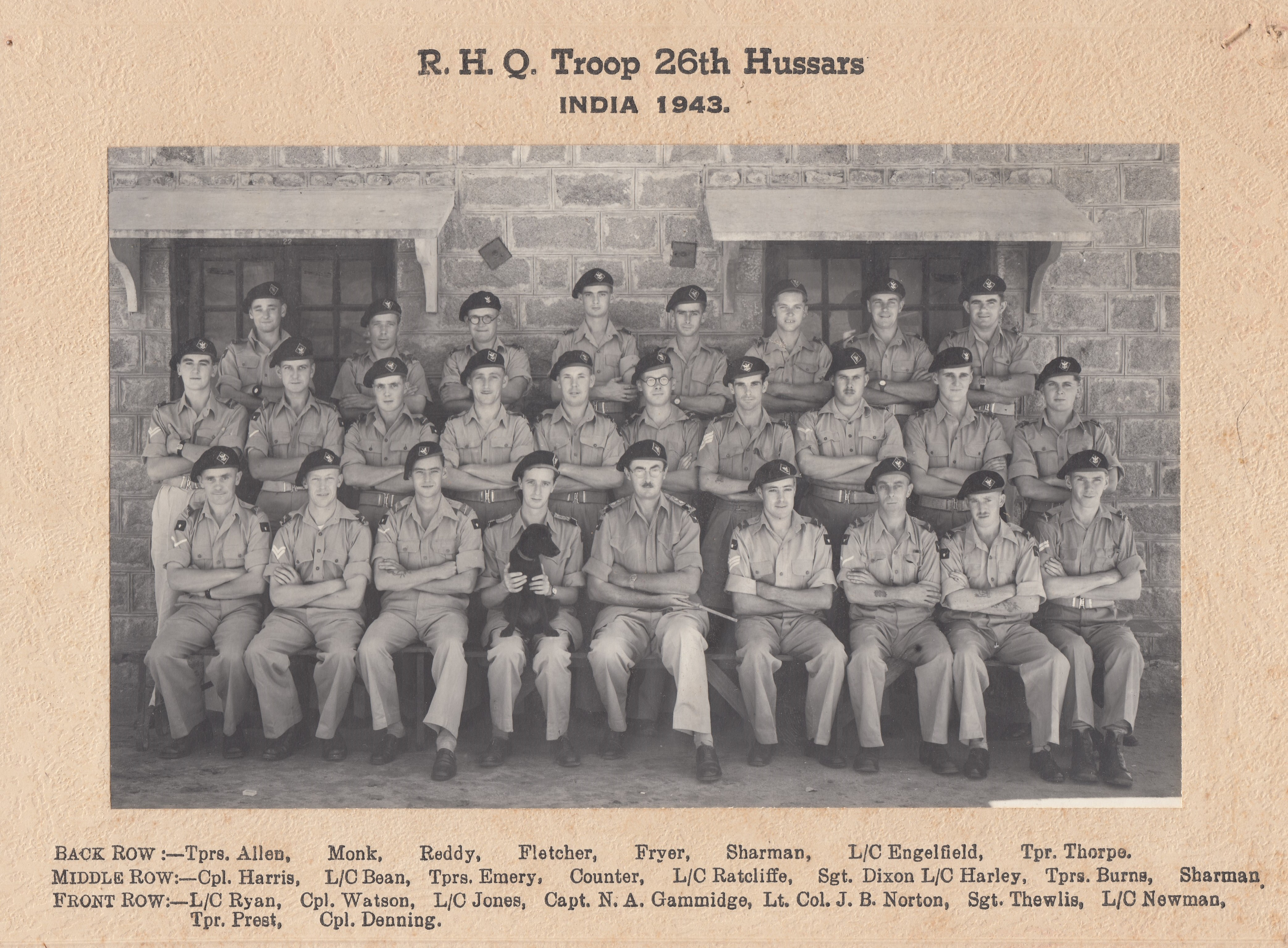
26th Hussars RHQ

The 26th Hussars was a cavalry regiment of the British Army from 1941 to 1943.

The regiment was raised at Meerut in June 1941 from a cadre of personnel taken from the 14th/20th King's Hussars. It was assigned to the 2nd Indian Armoured Brigade and was later moved to the 255th Indian Armoured Brigade at Sialkot.

Its badge was based on the Prussian eagle borne by the 14th/20th (but with the orb and sceptre reversed) with the addition of the regimental number on a scroll underneath.

It was disbanded at Bolarum, near Secunderabad, in October 1943. Some of the personnel were transferred to the 3rd Carabiniers, but the majority joined the Chindits force under Orde Wingate.
