= Cavalry Sunday =

Annual parade in London, England

Coordinates: 51.5050°N 0.1564°W

Combined Cavalry Old Comrades Memorial Parade, also known as Cavalry Sunday, is the annual parade which takes places in Hyde Park, London on the second Sunday of May to commemorate those killed in action. The parade is organised by the Combined Cavalry Old Comrades Association, which is made up of the cavalry and yeomanry regimental associations. The parade marches past the Cavalry War Memorial, where wreaths are laid, and is followed by a memorial service that is conducted from the bandstand in Hyde Park. Both serving and retired officers and soldiers participate in the parade, all wearing the traditional 'walking out' civilian dress of "lounge suits with medals and decorations" suits with bowler hats and furled umbrellas.The umbrellas are carried in the place of a sword or pacing stick. The parade also included uniformed members of the regiments.

The Cavalry War Memorial was unveiled on 21 May 1924 and the first wreath laying ceremony was held on 8 April 1925. Two years later, in 1927, the Combined Cavalry Old Comrades Association (CCOCA) was established and they have organised an annual parade and memorial service every year since.
