= Vickery =

Vickery is an English surname. Notable people with the surname include:

- Alice Vickery (1844–1929), English physician and campaigner for women's rights
- Brian Campbell Vickery (1918–2009), British information scientist
- Eben Vickery (1910–1974), Australian politician
- Ebenezer Vickery (1827–1906), Australian businessman, pastoralist and philanthropist
- Edward Vickery (1823–1883), Canadian merchant, ship builder and politician
- Frank Vickery (1951–2018), Welsh playwright and actor
- Howard Leroy Vickery (1892–1946), U.S. Navy admiral and merchant shipbuilder
- Hubert Bradford Vickery (1893–1978), Canadian-American biochemist
- Joe Vickery (born 1989), English rugby league footballer
- Joey Vickery (born 1967), Canadian basketball player
- John Vickery (artist) (1906–1983), Australian artist
- John Vickery (actor) (born 1950), American actor
- John Vickery (footballer) (born 1951), Australian rules footballer
- Joyce Winifred Vickery (1908–1979), Australian botanist
- Lindsay Vickery (born 1965), Australian composer and performer
- Luke Vickery (born 2005), Indonesian footballer
- Mack Vickery (1938–2004), American musician and songwriter
- Michael Vickery (1931–2017), American historian and author
- Michael Vickery (British Army officer) (1947–2022), British military officer
- Peter Vickery (1949/50–2022), Australian judge
- Phil Vickery (chef) (born 1961), English celebrity chef
- Phil Vickery (rugby union) (born 1976), English rugby union footballer
- Ray Vickery (born 1942), American attorney and politician
- Samuel Vickery (1873–1952), British soldier
- Sachia Vickery (born 1995), American tennis player
- Tim Vickery (born 1965), English football journalist
- Ty Vickery (born 1990), Australian rules footballer
- Walter Vickery (1909–2000), Welsh rugby union player
- William Kingston Vickery (1851–1925), American art dealer

== See also ==
- William Vickrey (1914–1996), Canadian-American professor of economics
- A.E. Vickery, American schooner of the late 19th century
- Vickery, Ohio, United States, an unincorporated community
