= Cavalry regiments of the British Army =

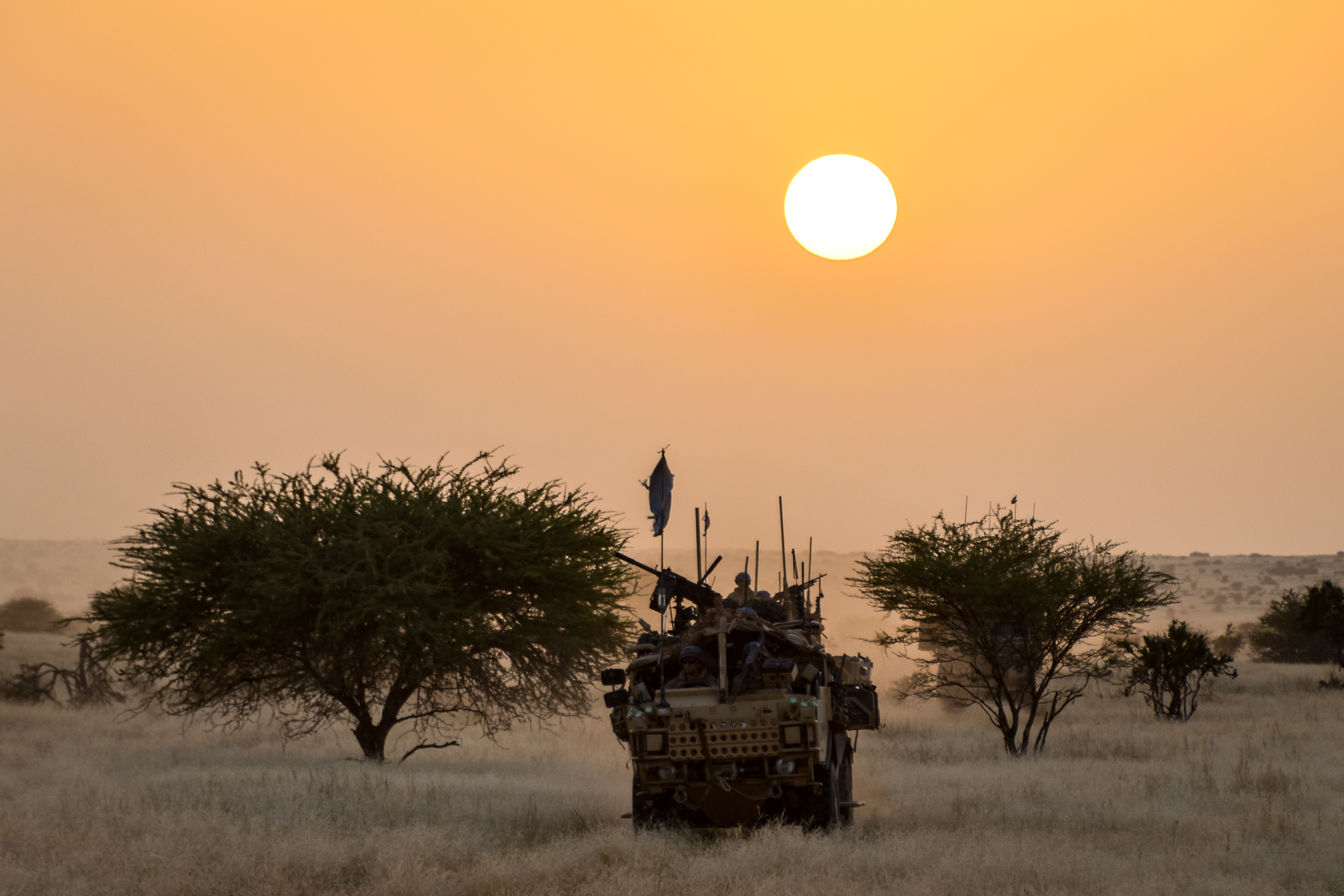
1st The Queen’s Dragoon Guards operating in Mali

There are 13 cavalry regiments of the British Army each with its own unique cap badge, regimental traditions, and history. Of the currently nine regular cavalry regiments, two serve as armoured regiments, three as armoured cavalry regiments, three as light cavalry, and one as a mounted ceremonial regiment. There are also four yeomanry regiments of the Army Reserve, of these, three serve as light cavalry and one as an armoured regiment. Each yeomanry light cavalry unit has been paired with a regular unit of the same role, the armoured yeomanry unit is paired with the two regular armoured units (and a further armoured unit which is not cavalry). All except the Household Cavalry are part of the British Army's Royal Armoured Corps.

== History ==
=== Early regiments ===
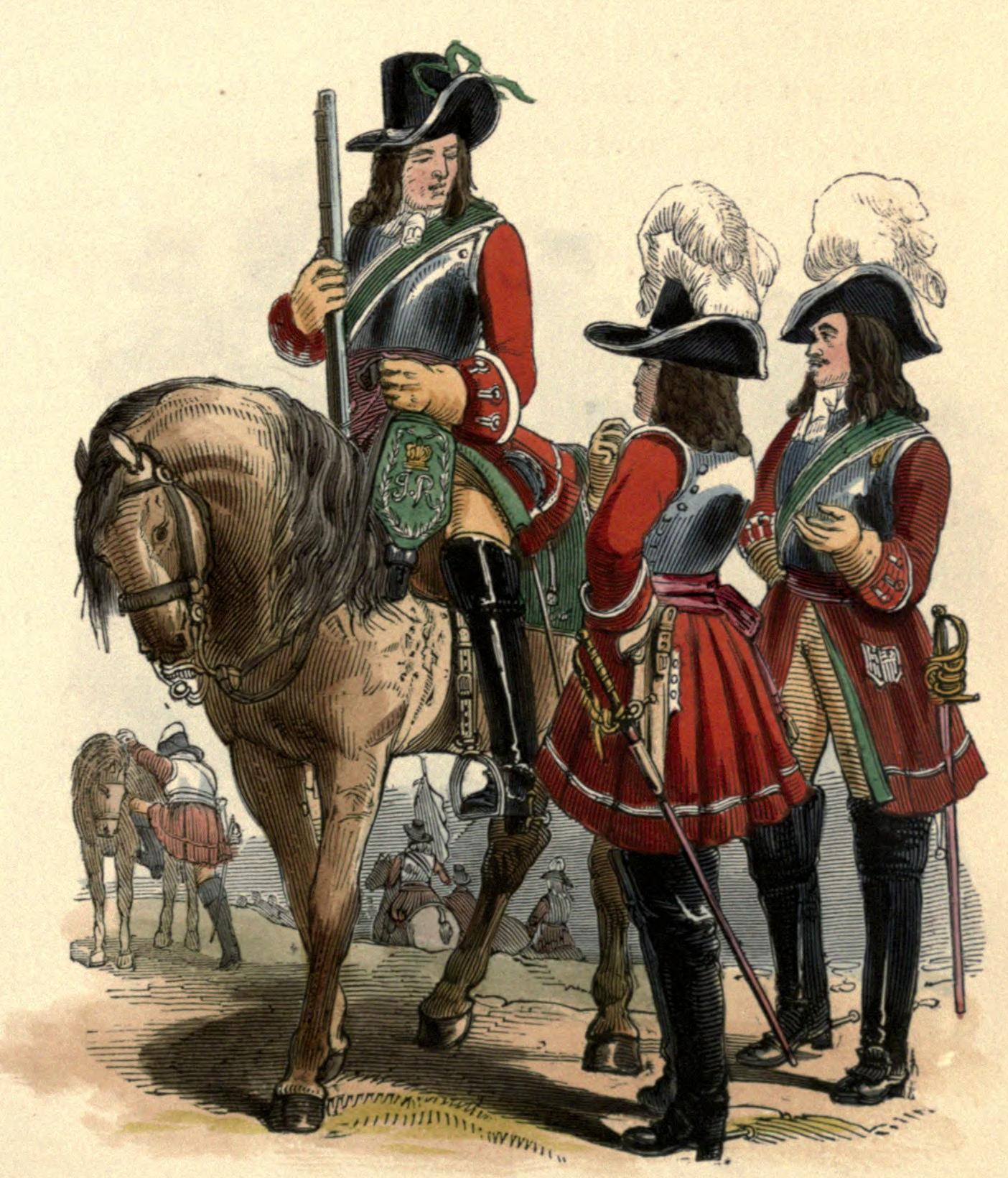
Troops of the Earl of Plymouth's Horse in 1687

The English and Scottish armies, the predecessors to the British Army, were raised in 1661 following the 1660 Stuart Restoration. Cavalry regiments of these armies included the 1st, 2nd and 3rd Troops of Horse Guards and the Royal Regiment of Horse; some of these had been part of the Royalist Army in Exile and others as part of the New Model Army. English and Scottish cavalry of the era were equipped as cuirassiers, with armour on the head and the body; the regulations of Charles II, in 1663, provided for them to be armed with "a sword and a case of pistols ... each Trooper of our Guards to have a carbine besides".

By the start of the eighteenth century, the cavalry establishment had been divided into household and line units. The household establishment consisted of four troops of Horse Guards and two of Horse Grenadier Guards, while the regular establishment was composed of nine regiments of Horse and eight of Dragoons. The "horse" regiments would in theory fight mounted as cavalry, while dragoons were originally mounted infantry - they would fight dismounted, but were provided with horses for swift movement. By the middle of the century, the term had come simply to mean light cavalry.

Regiments were, at this time, known by semi-permanent nicknames or by the names of their colonels; in 1751, in an attempt to reduce confusion, regiments were assigned numbers in order of their seniority. The cavalry regiments of the line were numbered in three separate sequences; 1st through 4th Horse, then 1st through 3rd Dragoon Guards, then 1st through 14th Dragoons. "Dragoon Guards" was a new title, and did not denote a Guards' role; it was adopted by the three senior horse regiments in 1746, when George II reduced them to the status of dragoons in order to save money.

The first "light horse" regiment was raised in 1745, for service in the Second Jacobite rising, and proved so successful that light troops were added to most cavalry regiments in 1755. In 1759, five complete regiments (the 15th to 19th) of Light Dragoons were formed, and the distinction was made between the light cavalry (Light Dragoon regiments) and the heavy cavalry (Dragoon and Dragoon Guard regiments). Henceforth, all newly raised regiments of cavalry would be denoted Light Dragoons. By 1783, the 7th to 14th Dragoons had become the 7th to 14th Light Dragoons, changing from heavy to light roles.

The various troops of Horse Guards and Horse Grenadier Guards were regimented in 1788, forming the 1st Regiment of Life Guards and 2nd Regiment of Life Guards; together with the Royal Regiment of Horse Guards they formed the Household Cavalry. The same year, the remaining four Horse regiments were retitled as the 4th to 7th Dragoon Guards.

==== The Yeomanry and Fencible Cavalry ====
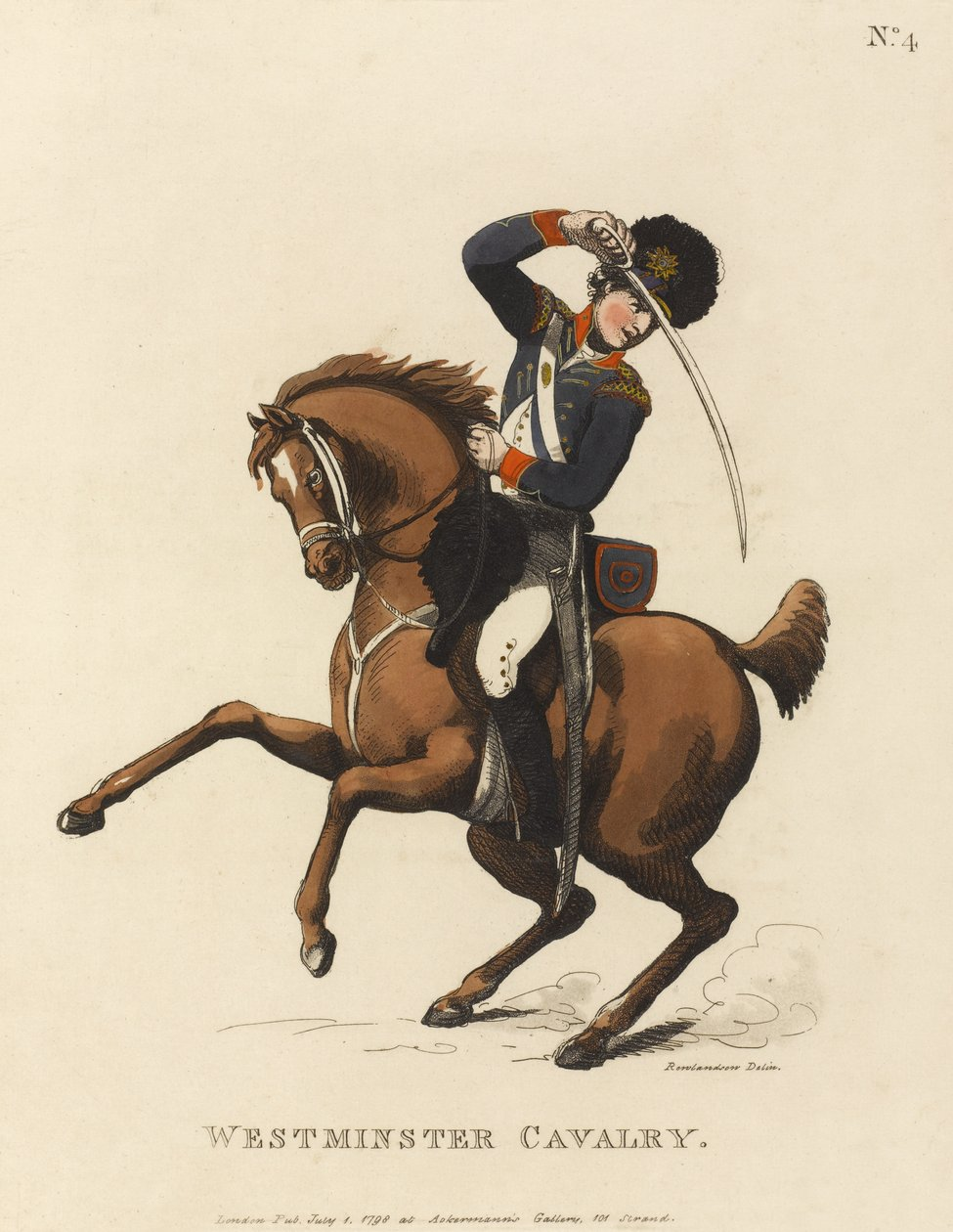
c. 1798 engraving of a Westminster Volunteer Cavalry trooper

Some thirty-four regiments of fencible cavalry— regiments raised for home service only—were raised in 1794 and 1795, in response to an invasion scare; all had disbanded by the end of the French Revolutionary Wars in 1802. At the same time, a large number of troops of volunteer cavalry were raised on a county level, consisting of local gentry and yeoman farmers; from the latter they took the description yeomanry. These troops formed into yeomanry regiments, organised broadly by county, around 1800; their history thereafter is complex, with many disbanding, reforming, and changing title intermittently. However, most remained in existence throughout the nineteenth century, seeing occasional service quelling riots and helping to maintain public order.

=== Nineteenth Century ===
By the turn of the century, in 1801, the Household Cavalry establishment consisted of three regiments of guards, while the line cavalry had some twenty-seven regiments of dragoons and dragoon guards. The heavy cavalry consisted of twelve regiments, the 1st to 7th Dragoon Guards and the 1st to 6th Dragoons—the missing regiment was the 5th Dragoons, disbanded for mutiny in 1799 without renumbering younger regiments—while the light cavalry consisted of the 7th through 29th Light Dragoons and two regiments of German cavalry on the British establishment. Many of the light cavalry regiments were disbanded after the Napoleonic Wars; at their peak in 1794, there had been some 33 regiments of light dragoons, but by 1822 the most junior regiment was the 17th Light Dragoons.

In 1806, the 10th Light Dragoons became the 10th Hussars, taking a title made popular by Continental cavalry; the 5th, 15th and 18th followed in 1807. In 1816 three more regiments changed their title to "Lancers", and in 1818 two more dragoon regiments became light dragoons. By 1861, the last light dragoons retitled as hussars, leaving three regiments of dragoons and seven of dragoon guards in the heavy cavalry, with nine regiments of hussars and five of lancers in the light cavalry. By this point, the distinction between heavy and light cavalry regiments had effectively vanished, as both fought in the same manner and were equipped in the same way—with the exception of the lancers, who retained their lances. In 1862 the army received a further four regiments of cavalry, the European light cavalry regiments formerly part of the forces of the Honourable East India Company.

==== Imperial Yeomanry ====
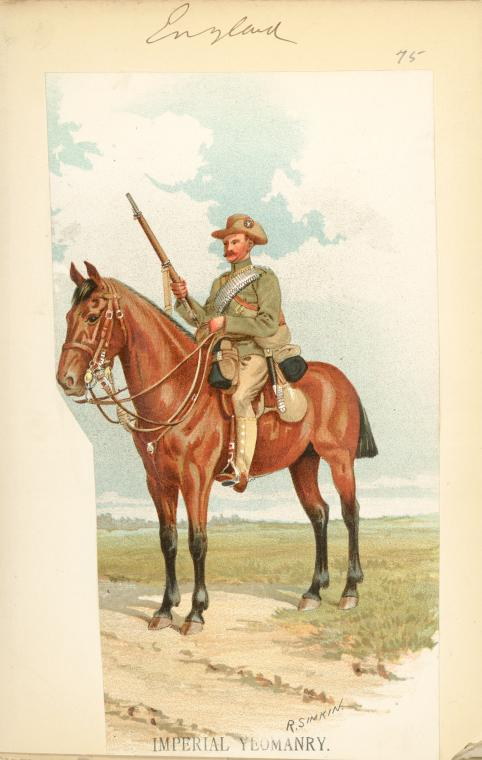
Illustration of an Imperial Yeomanry trooper

The outbreak of the South African War in 1899 caused some sharp setbacks for the British forces, leading to a high demand for additional troops to be despatched, especially light cavalry. However, it was not possible to embody the Yeomanry for overseas service; they were raised to be only liable for service in the British Isles, to resist invasion or for internal security. As a result, the Imperial Yeomanry was created in January 1900 as a volunteer cavalry corps. Some 34,000 men were sent to South Africa on one-year enlistments through 1900 and 1901, the majority coming initially from existing regiments of yeomanry. Many companies were raised and sponsored by yeomanry regiments—for example, the Leicestershire Yeomanry sponsored the 7th (Leicestershire) and the 65th (Leicestershire) Companies—and these regiments later took the battle honours of their sponsored companies when they returned from overseas service.

All Imperial Yeomanry battalions were equipped as mounted infantry, using infantry organisation and terminology (note "battalion" and "company", rather than "regiment" and "squadron"); this proved highly useful in South Africa, where fast-moving infantry was invaluable for a fluid war spread over enormous areas. As the first contingent of volunteers returned, and the lessons of the war were absorbed by the Army, it was decided to convert the Yeomanry into mounted infantry along the same lines.

The new Yeomanry regiments, appropriately retitled as "Imperial Yeomanry", comprised four companies of mounted infantry with carbines, and a machine-gun section; by 1903, an additional nineteen regiments of Imperial Yeomanry had been raised, with several perpetuating the lineages of volunteer units in South Africa or of previously disbanded Yeomanry regiments. In 1908, the reserve forces underwent significant reforms; the Yeomanry and the infantry Volunteers were consolidated into the Territorial Force. The Yeomanry dropped its designation of "Imperial Yeomanry", and most regiments converted back from the mounted infantry role to become lancers, hussars or dragoons. Four regiments were assigned to the Special Reserve, rather than the Territorials, and were no longer considered Yeomanry.

=== Twentieth century ===
The last major use of conventional cavalry by the Army was in the First World War. However, the anticipated war of manoeuvre on the Western Front never took place, and the cavalry forces were never employed in their intended role; instead, many saw intermittent service as dismounted infantry. This was especially true of the yeomanry regiments; indeed, the 74th (Yeomanry) Division was composed entirely of yeomanry regiments serving as infantry, and in 1918 many regiments began to be formally converted to infantry units. However, mounted cavalry did play a major role in the Sinai and Palestine theatre, most notably at the Battle of Beersheba.

While it generally appears that no new regiments of cavalry were raised during the War, this is not entirely accurate. All of the yeomanry units raised second- and third-line regiments from new recruits, and on the outbreak of war some seventeen Cavalry Reserve Regiments were formed. Few of these units saw active service, instead serving to train and equip men for the front-line regiments, or as reserve units for home defence. The Tank Corps—the forerunner of the Royal Tank Regiment—was formed in 1917, but was not considered as "cavalry" until the 1940s.

Following the War, and the subsequent reduction in the strength of the Army, it was apparent that future warfare would involve much less of a role for cavalry. As such, the regular force was reduced from 31 regiments of cavalry to 22. Unlike previous reductions, however, this was carried out by the amalgamation of regiments rather than the disbanding of junior regiments; this allowed the traditions and honours of both "parents" to be perpetuated.

Before the Second World War, cavalry recruits were required to be at least 5 feet 2 inches tall, but could not exceed 5 feet 9 inches. They initially enlisted for six years with the colours and a further six years with the reserve.

==== Mechanisation ====
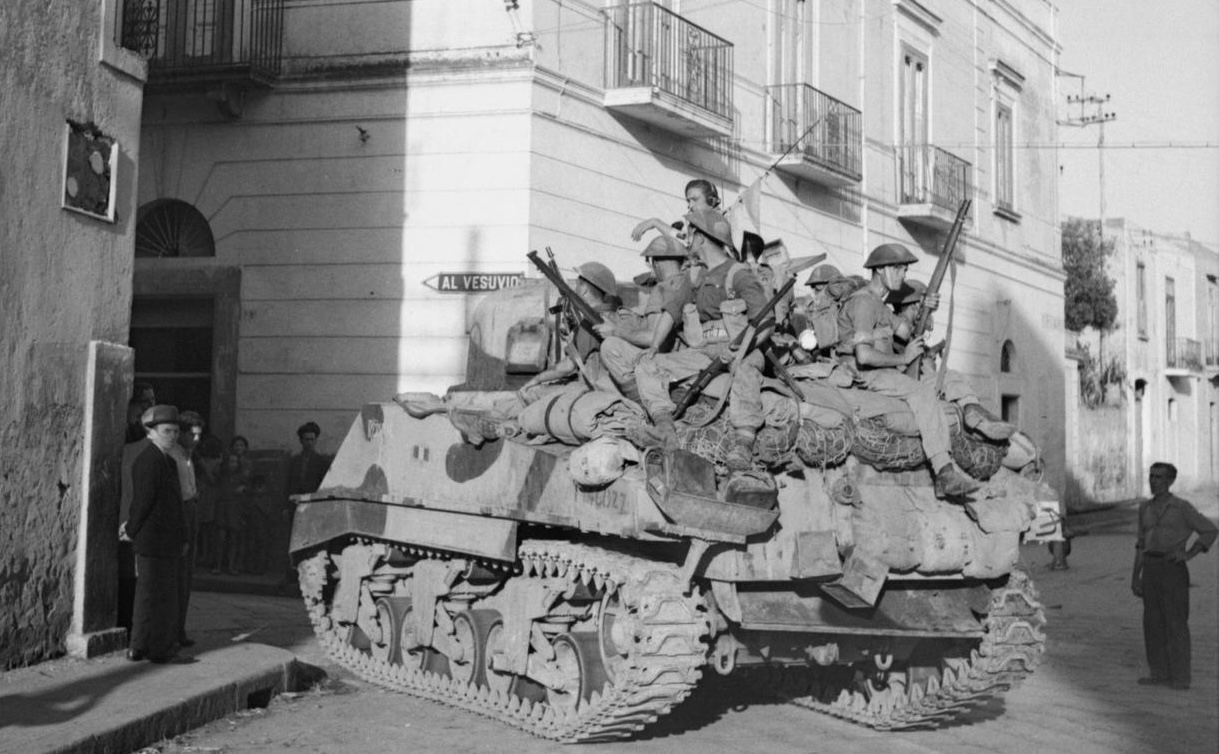
A Sherman tank of the Royal Scots Greys in Torre Annunziata, 1 October 1943

In October 1928, a new era began as the 11th Hussars became the first regular cavalry regiment to "mechanise", to change from a horsed cavalry role to a motorised one, re-equipping with armoured cars previously used by the Royal Tank Corps. Other regiments followed suit; in April 1939, the Royal Armoured Corps was formed to encompass the eighteen mechanised cavalry regiments of the line alongside the eight battalions of the Royal Tank Regiment, but did not include the Household Cavalry. The remaining two regular cavalry regiments were based in Palestine, and following the outbreak of war retained their horses until 1940 (the Royal Dragoons) and 1941 (the Royal Scots Greys). Following mechanisation, the few remaining distinctions of unit type became meaningless; cavalry regiments moved between the heavy and light armoured roles regardless of their names.

Seven regiments of the Yeomanry, previously affiliated with the Royal Tank Regiment, were taken into the Royal Armoured Corps on its formation, and a number more would convert to the armoured role during the Second World War. However, in the reorganisation of the reserve forces in the late 1930s, many Yeomanry regiments were reorganised as artillery units, and transferred into the Royal Artillery.

The Royal Armoured Corps itself formed a number of armoured regiments, converted from territorial infantry battalions, and the Reconnaissance Corps (taken into the Royal Armoured Corps in 1944) several mechanised reconnaissance units, all of which were classed with the cavalry. Other war-formed units included twelve Territorial Army battalions of the Royal Tank Regiment, converted from infantry in 1938 and 1939, and six new line cavalry regiments, the 22nd through 27th. These were arbitrarily termed as hussars, lancers or dragoons, but with no meaning; none would survive past 1948.

After the war, the regular cavalry was quickly reduced to its pre-war establishment, and reduced further by the 1957 Defence White Paper; as a result of this, seven regular cavalry regiments were lost through amalgamation, leaving two household, sixteen line regiments. The subsequent round of cuts, in 1969–71, saw a further three line regiments disappear, and the 1990 Options for Change defence review reduced the establishment by another five line regiments, along with amalgamating the regiments of the Household Cavalry.

The Yeomanry had been reduced even further in the post-war years; most regiments were amalgamated in the 1950s and then reduced to cadres in the late 1960s, with a sizable fraction being converted to infantry, artillery, or support roles. By the end of the Cold War, there were five regiments of "pure" Yeomanry in the Territorial Army, all in the light reconnaissance role, with five regiments of the Royal Artillery, eight of the Royal Engineers and eleven of the Royal Signals titled as "Yeomanry" and retaining lineages from a yeomanry regiment.

== Amalgamation of cavalry regiments from 1922 to 2015 ==
The 31 British cavalry regiments created by the Childers Reforms in 1881 were amalgamated into eight regiments by 2015. The table below gives an overview of this process.

1881 Childers Reforms	1922 Amalgamations	1957 Defence White Paper	1966 Defence White Paper	1990 Options for Change	2010 Strategic Defence and Security Review
1st Regiment of Life Guards	Life Guards (Note: The Life Guards and the Blues and Royals were operationally combined into the Household Cavalry Regiment under Options for Change, but administratively retain their own separate regimental identities.)				
2nd Regiment of Life Guards	Life Guards				
Royal Horse Guards			Blues and Royals (Royal Horse Guards and 1st Dragoons)		
1st The Royal Dragoons			Blues and Royals (Royal Horse Guards and 1st Dragoons)		
1st King's Dragoon Guards		1st The Queen's Dragoon Guards			
2nd Dragoon Guards (Queen's Bays)		1st The Queen's Dragoon Guards			
3rd Dragoon Guards	3rd Carabiniers (Prince of Wales's Dragoon Guards)		Royal Scots Dragoon Guards (Carabiniers and Greys)		
6th Dragoon Guards (Carabiniers)	3rd Carabiniers (Prince of Wales's Dragoon Guards)		Royal Scots Dragoon Guards (Carabiniers and Greys)		
2nd Dragoons (Royal Scots Greys)			Royal Scots Dragoon Guards (Carabiniers and Greys)		
4th (Royal Irish) Dragoon Guards	4th/7th Royal Dragoon Guards			Royal Dragoon Guards	
7th (Princess Royal's) Dragoon Guards	4th/7th Royal Dragoon Guards			Royal Dragoon Guards	
5th (Princess Charlotte of Wales's) Dragoon Guards	5th Royal Inniskilling Dragoon Guards			Royal Dragoon Guards	
6th (Inniskilling) Dragoons	5th Royal Inniskilling Dragoon Guards			Royal Dragoon Guards	
3rd (King's Own) Hussars		Queen's Own Hussars		Queen's Royal Hussars (Queen's Own and Royal Irish)	
7th (Queen's Own) Hussars		Queen's Own Hussars		Queen's Royal Hussars (Queen's Own and Royal Irish)	
4th (Queen's Own) Hussars		Queen's Royal Irish Hussars		Queen's Royal Hussars (Queen's Own and Royal Irish)	
8th (King's Royal Irish) Hussars		Queen's Royal Irish Hussars		Queen's Royal Hussars (Queen's Own and Royal Irish)	
16th (Queen's) Lancers	16th/5th The Queen's Royal Lancers			Queen's Royal Lancers	Royal Lancers (Queen Elizabeths' Own)
5th (Royal Irish) Lancers	16th/5th The Queen's Royal Lancers			Queen's Royal Lancers	Royal Lancers (Queen Elizabeths' Own)
17th (Duke of Cambridge's Own) Lancers	17th/21st Lancers			Queen's Royal Lancers	Royal Lancers (Queen Elizabeths' Own)
21st (Empress of India's) Lancers	17th/21st Lancers			Queen's Royal Lancers	Royal Lancers (Queen Elizabeths' Own)
9th (Queen's Royal) Lancers			9th/12th Royal Lancers (Prince of Wales's)		Royal Lancers (Queen Elizabeths' Own)
12th (Prince of Wales's Royal) Lancers			9th/12th Royal Lancers (Prince of Wales's)		Royal Lancers (Queen Elizabeths' Own)
13th Hussars	13th/18th Royal Hussars (Queen Mary's Own)			Light Dragoons	
18th (Queen Mary's Own) Hussars	13th/18th Royal Hussars (Queen Mary's Own)			Light Dragoons	
15th (The King's) Hussars	15th/19th The King's Royal Hussars			Light Dragoons	
19th (Queen Alexandra's Own Royal) Hussars	15th/19th The King's Royal Hussars			Light Dragoons	
10th (Prince of Wales's Own Royal) Hussars			Royal Hussars (Prince of Wales's Own)	King's Royal Hussars	
11th (Prince Albert's Own) Hussars			Royal Hussars (Prince of Wales's Own)	King's Royal Hussars	
14th (King's) Hussars	14th/20th King's Hussars			King's Royal Hussars	
20th Hussars	14th/20th King's Hussars			King's Royal Hussars	

== Modern cavalry ==
There are currently 9 regiments of cavalry in the regular Army, and a further 4 Yeomanry regiments in the Army Reserve. In British terminology, a cavalry or armoured "regiment" is a battalion-sized unit.

=== Ceremonial ===
- Household Cavalry Mounted Regiment

=== Armoured Regiments ===
Armoured regiments are equipped with Challenger 2 main battle tanks, which are being replaced by Challenger 3 main battle tanks:

Regular:

- Queen's Royal Hussars
- King's Royal Hussars
- Royal Tank Regiment, which includes an additional CBRN reconnaissance squadron operating under 28 Engineer Regiment

Reserve:

- Royal Wessex Yeomanry

=== Armoured Cavalry Regiments ===
Armoured cavalry regiments are equipped with Warrior armoured fighting vehicles (being replaced by Ajax); they have no paired reserve units:

- Household Cavalry Regiment
- Royal Dragoon Guards
- Royal Lancers

=== Light Cavalry ===
Light cavalry regiments are equipped with Jackal vehicles:

Regular:

- 1st The Queen's Dragoon Guards
- Royal Scots Dragoon Guards
- Light Dragoons

Reserve:

- Royal Yeomanry
- Queen's Own Yeomanry
- Scottish and North Irish Yeomanry

== See also ==
- Cavalry Sunday
