= Michael Vickery (British Army officer) =

British Military Officer

Michael Jon Howorth Vickery OBE (15 June 1947 – 13 December 2022) was a British military officer and veteran of the Gulf War.

== Biography ==
Vickery was born on 15 June 1947, in Yorkshire. The son of Wing Commander Lionel Vickery and Audrey (née Howorth), he was the middle child in a military family. Educated at Haileybury and Imperial Service College, Vickery taught at Summer Fields School for a year before entering Royal Military Academy Sandhurst in 1966. He joined the 14th/20th King’s Hussars in 1968.

Vickery's military career included notable expertise in armoured warfare and equestrian skills. He completed rigorous training at both the Royal Armoured Corps Centre in Bovington and the French cavalry school in Saumur. His proficiency in armoured tactics and his ability to speak French were recognized as assets.

During the Gulf War, Vickery, then a lieutenant colonel, commanded the 14th/20th King's Hussars in Operation Desert Storm. His role involved overcoming logistical and operational challenges, including rebuilding his tank fleet after initial resource limitations. His leadership during the conflict contributed to the operational readiness and effectiveness of his regiment.

Known for his calm demeanor and approachability, Vickery earned respect from his subordinates. He demonstrated the ability to navigate political interactions and media relations during the war, including engagements with political figures such as Prime Minister John Major.

After the Gulf War, Vickery was awarded an OBE (Military). He continued his career in the Ministry of Defence's operational requirements branch and later worked in the private sector with Computing Devices of Canada and General Dynamics (UK). He also served as secretary of Lady Grover's Fund, a military charity.

Colonel Vickery died on 13 December 2022, at the age of 75 following a stroke.

== Personal life ==
Vickery's personal life included two marriages, the first to Anne Holbrook, which ended in divorce, followed by a marriage to Suzie Crean. He had three children: Jonathan, Tom, and Katie.
