= 14th/20th King's Hussars =

- Active: 1922–1992
- Country: United Kingdom
- Branch: British Army
- Type: Line Cavalry
- Size: One regiment
- Part of: Royal Armoured Corps
- March: Quick – Royal Sussex

Commanders
- Colonel-in-Chief: Anne, Princess Royal

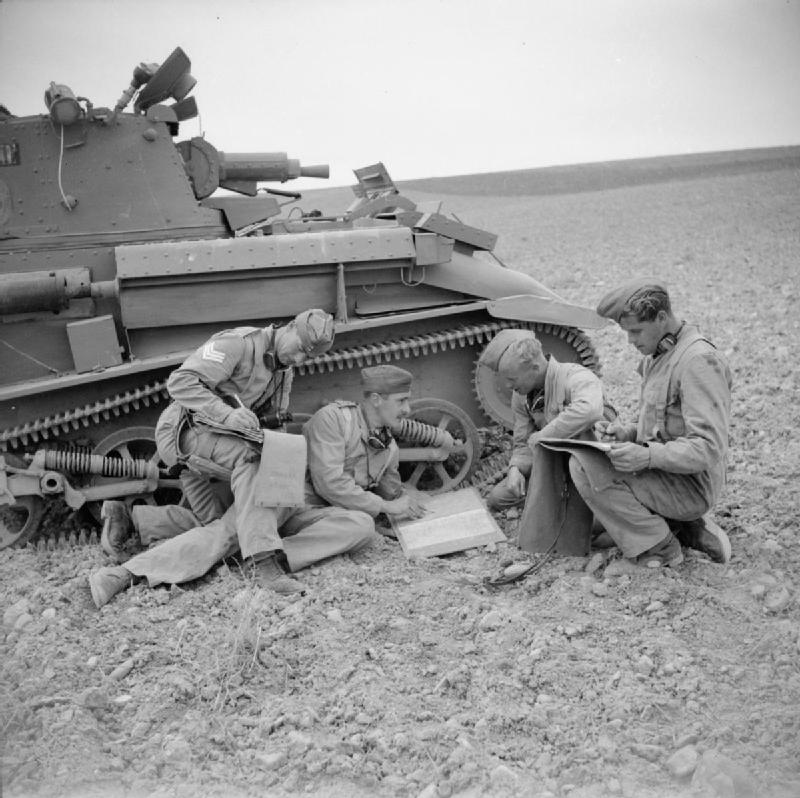
Light Tank Mk VI and crew from 14th/20th Kings Hussars in Iraq, 25 April 1942.

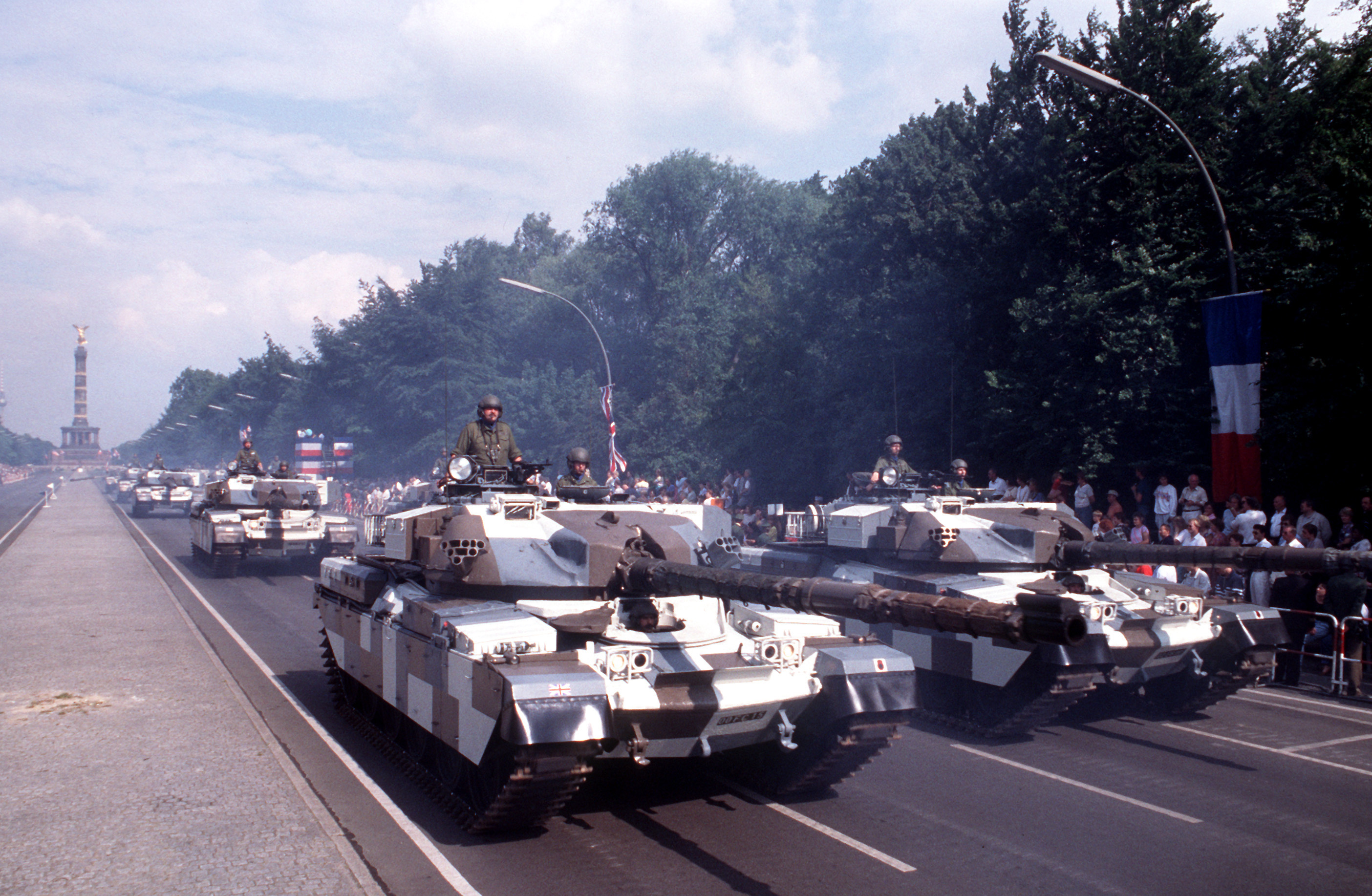
Chieftain tanks of 14th/20th King's Hussars on parade in urban camouflage, Straße des 17. Juni, West Berlin, 18 June 1989

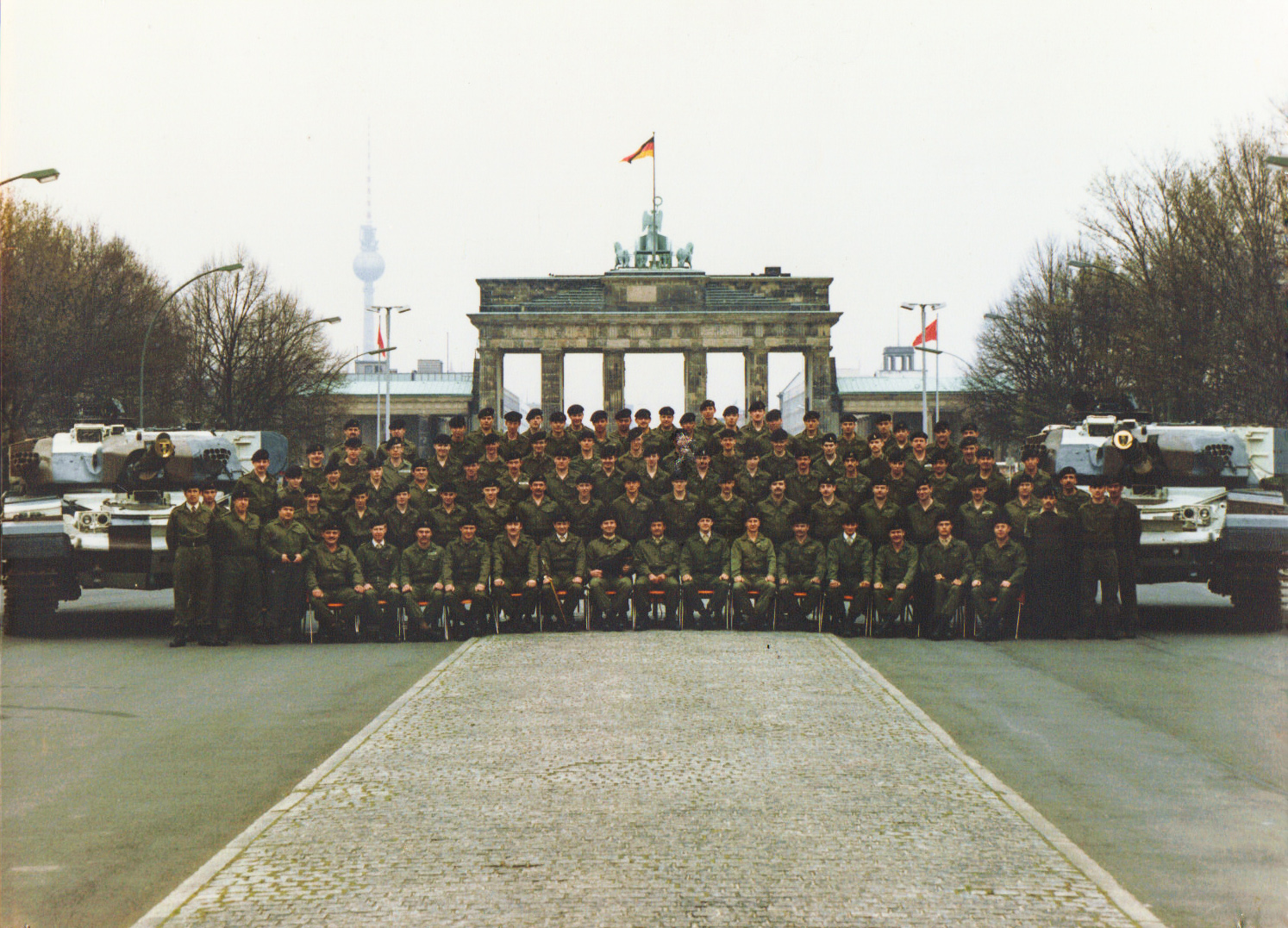
C Squadron 14th/20th Kings Hussars, West Berlin 1989.

The 14th/20th King's Hussars was a cavalry regiment of the British Army. It was created by the amalgamation of the 14th King's Hussars and the 20th Hussars in 1922 and, after service in the Second World War, it amalgamated with the Royal Hussars to become the King's Royal Hussars in 1992.

== History ==
The regiment, which was initially styled the 14th/20th Hussars, was created by the amalgamation of the 14th King's Hussars and the 20th Hussars in 1922. It was re-titled the 14th/20th King's Hussars in December 1936. The regiment, which was based in India at the start of the Second World War, dispatched a cadre of personnel to form the 26th Hussars in February 1941. The remainder of the regiment was deployed to Iraq and Persia later that year to guard the oil fields. It landed in Italy in 1944 and then took part in the capture of Medicina in April 1945.

After the war the regiment remained in Germany until 1946 when it moved to Cambrai Lines at Catterick Garrison as RAC Training Regiment. It moved to Haig Lines in Church Crookham in January 1951 and then deployed to Libya in November 1952. The regiment joined 20th Armoured Brigade and moved to Portsmouth Barracks in Münster in March 1956 and then transferred to 11th Infantry Brigade and re-located to Haig Barracks in Hohne in November 1960.

The regiment deployed to Wavell Barracks in Benghazi, Libya in 1962 from where it sent units to Cyprus in December 1963 and again in May 1965. It returned home in January 1966 but joined 6th Infantry Brigade and moved to Barker Barracks in Paderborn, Germany in Detcember 1966. In June 1970 it returned home to join 5th Infantry Brigade with its base at Aliwal Barracks in Tidworth Camp from where it deployed units to Northern Ireland at the height of the Troubles. It returned to West Germany in a new role as a recce regiment based at Harewood Barracks in Herford in May 1973 from where it continued to deploy units to Northern Ireland. It moved to Bovington Camp as RAC Centre Regiment in May 1976 and then joined 1st Armoured Division with its new base at Caen Barracks in Hohne in December 1977.

The regiment re-roled as RAC Centre Regiment at Cambrai Barracks at Catterick Garrison in May 1985 and then returned to West Germany to join 4th Infantry Brigade based at York Barracks at Münster in March 1988. It was amalgamated with the Royal Hussars to become the King's Royal Hussars on 4 December 1992.

Having deployed to Saudi Arabia in December 1990 as part of Op Granby, the 14th/20th Battlegroup participated in actions from 25 February 1991 to 28 February 1991 during the first gulf war, winning battle honours for this.

== Regimental museum ==
The Museum of the 14th/20th King's Hussars was in the Museum of Lancashire in Preston until it closed in 2016.

== Battle honours ==
The combined battle honours of the 14th King's Hussars and the 20th Hussars, plus:

- Second World War: Bologna, Medicina, Italy 1945
- Later wars: Wadi al Batin, Gulf 1991

== Commanding Officers ==
The Commanding Officers have been:

- 1959–1961: Lt.-Col. Edward G.W.T. Walsh
- 1961–1964: Lt.-Col. Gilbert A.L.C. Talbot
- 1964–1966: Lt.-Col. Simon R.M. Frazer
- 1966–1969: Lt.-Col. Peter B. Cavendish
- 1969–1972: Lt.-Col. J. Michael Palmer
- 1972–1974: Lt.-Col. Thomas G. Williams
- 1974–1977: Lt.-Col. William J. Stockton
- 1977–1979: Lt.-Col. John A. Pharo-Tomlin
- 1979–1982: Lt.-Col. Daniel L. De Beaujeu
- 1982–1984: Lt.-Col. Peter Harman
- 1984–1987: Lt.-Col. John R. Smales
- 1987–1989: Lt.-Col. Christopher K. Price
- 1989–1992: Lt.-Col. Michael J.H. Vickery
- 1992: Lt.-Col. David J.B. Woodd

== Colonel-in-Chief ==
- 1969: Princess Anne, The Princess Royal, KG, KT, GCVO

== Regimental Colonels ==
Colonels of the Regiment were:

- 1920–1930: (14th Hussars): Maj-Gen. Sir Henry West Hodgson, KCMG, CB, CVO
- 1920–1937: (20th Hussars): Gen. Sir George de Symons Barrow, GCB, KCMG
- 1937–1947: Brig. Frank Brereton Hurndall, MC
- 1947–1957: Gen. Sir Richard Loudon McCreery, GCB, KBE, DSO, MC
- 1957–1966: Col. Robert James Stephen, MBE
- 1966–1972: Col. Basil Bethune Neville Woodd
- 1972–1976: Lt.-Col. Ralph Percy David Fortescue Allen, MBE
- 1976–1981: Maj-Gen. Peter Boucher Cavendish, OBE
- 1981–1992: Maj-Gen. Sir Joseph Michael Palmer, KCVO.
- 1992: Regiment amalgamated with The Royal Hussars (Prince of Wales's Own), to form The King's Royal Hussars
