= Museum of Lancashire =

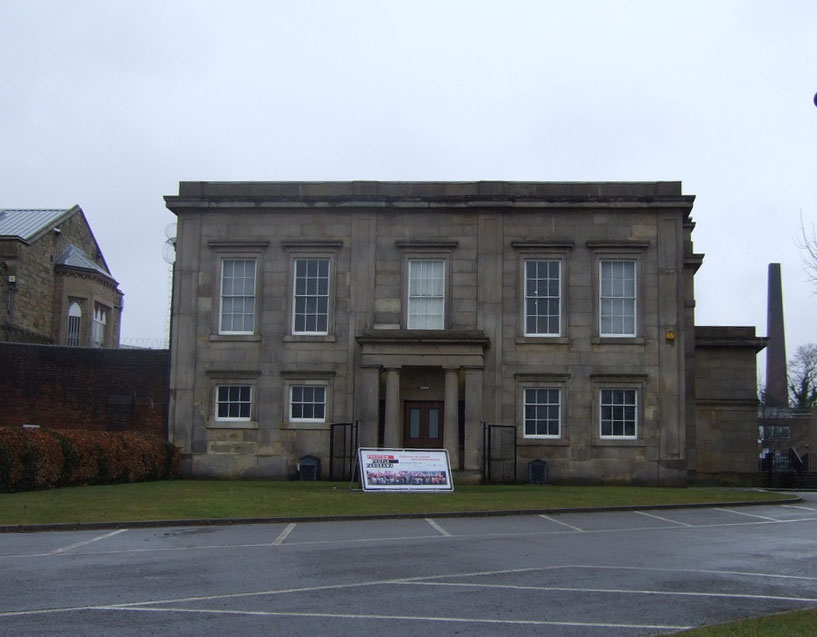
- The old Sessions House

- Location in Preston
- Location: Stanley Street, Preston, England
- Coordinates: 53.7614°N 2.6883°W
- Type: Museum
- Website: Museum of Lancashire

Listed Building – Grade II
- Official name: The old Sessions House
- Designated: 27 September 1979
- Reference no.: 1219103

The Museum of Lancashire is a museum with several historic collections in Preston in Lancashire, England. The museum, which is based in the old Sessions House, is a Grade II listed building.

== History ==
Construction of the courthouse, which was commissioned to accommodate meetings of the nisi prius court and the quarter sessions, began in 1825. It was designed by Thomas Rickman in the Neo-Classical style.. Baines' 1825 History and Directory of Lancashire comments that, 'The prison is on a very large scale, but the Court-house, which is inconveniently situated in the centre of the building, is not sufficiently commodious, and at the general session for the county, held by adjournment on 9 September 1824, the sum of ten thousand pounds was voted by magistrates, for the erection of a new court-house and records office, which are to be placed outside the walls of the present gaol'. Hewitson, in his History of Preston states that the building was erected in 1829 and refers to Mr Rickman as the architect. He goes on to add that a new dome was added in 1849 and in 1870, due to the dangerous state of the dome it was replaced by a ceiling light. The design involved a symmetrical main frontage with five bays facing onto Stanley Street; the central section featured a porch with Doric order columns.

== Collections ==
The collections include: Lancashire Through Time (archeological collections etc.), Lancashire at Work (local industries etc.), Lancashire at Play (the Hylda Baker costume collection and Les Dawson, George Formby and Gracie Fields material), Lancashire Goes to War (an atmospheric First World War trench), Lancashire Law and Order (court house material, Lancashire home front and the 14th/20th King's Hussars.

== Closure ==
In November 2015 it was announced that Lancashire County Council would withdraw funding from five of its museums: Fleetwood Museum, Helmshore Mills Textile Museum, Judges' Lodgings, Museum of Lancashire and Queen Street Mill because of what the leader of the council described as "the financial challenges facing the county council as we deal with relentless cuts to central government funding combined with rising demand for our services". They were initially to close at the end of March 2016 but that month were reprieved until September 2016. The Museum closed on 30 September 2016, along with the other four Lancashire museums mentioned above, but remained open for pre-booked school groups. As of 3 June 2017 Lancashire County Council's website stated that "Negotiations are underway with a potential new operator. We will keep you updated on progress.", but by 16 August 2017 that statement had been removed and the website simply stated "Museum of Lancashire is closed except for pre-booked school visits. Schools are still welcome to book all learning sessions." In July 2019 following approval of an ongoing annual budget of £155,000 to maintain the facility, the leader of Lancashire County Council, Keith Iddon, stated "The 'ultimate ambition' for the Museum of Lancashire in Preston is for it to reopen".

== See also ==
- Listed buildings in Preston, Lancashire
